This page lists topics related to ancient Greece.

0–9 

 226 BC Rhodes earthquake
 426 BC Malian Gulf tsunami
 464 BC Sparta earthquake

A 

 Aba
 Abae
 Abaris the Hyperborean
 Abas
 Abas (son of Lynceus)
 Abderus
 Ablerus (mythology)
 Abolla
 Abron (ancient Greece)
 Absyrtus
 Acacallis
 Acacus
 Academic skepticism
 Academus
 Acamantis
 Acamas
 Acamas (son of Antenor)
 Acamas (son of Theseus)
 Acantha
 Acanthis
 Acanthus
 Acanthus of Sparta
 Acarnan (son of Alcmaeon)
 Acarnania
 Acarnanian League
 Acaste (Oceanid)
 Acastus
 Acatalepsy
 Aceso
 Acestor
 Achaea (ancient region)
 Achaea (Roman province)
 Achaea Phthiotis
 Achaean Leaders
 Achaean League
 Achaeans (Homer)
 Achaeans (tribe)
 Achaemenid destruction of Athens
 Achaeus (general)
 Achaeus
 Achaeus of Eretria
 Achaeus of Syracuse
 Achelois
 Acheloos Painter
 Achelous
 Acherdus
 Acheron
 Acherusia
 Achilleion (Thessaly)
 Achilleis (trilogy)
 Achilles
 Achilles and Patroclus
 Achilles' heel
 Achilles on Skyros
 Achilles Painter
 Achillicus
 Achiroe
 Achlys
 Acis and Galatea
 Acmon
 Acmon of Phrygia
 Acraea
 Acratopotes
 Acrion
 Acrisius
 Acrocorinth
 Acropolis
 Acropolis of Athens
 Acrotatus (father of Areus I)
 Acrotatus (king of Sparta)
 Acroterion
 Actaeon
 Actaeus
 Actor (mythology)
 Acumenus
 Acusilaus
 Adamas (mythology)
 Adeimantus of Collytus
 Adeimantus of Corinth
 Adephagia
 Adiaphora
 Adikia
 Admete (Oceanid)
 Admetus
 Admetus (mythology)
 Adonia
 Adonis
 Adrasteia
 Adrasteia (mythology)
 Adrastus
 Adrastus (mythology)
 Adrastus of Aphrodisias
 Adrastus (son of Gordias)
 Adrestia
 Adultery in Classical Athens
 Adymus of Beroea
 Adyton
 Aeaces (father of Polycrates)
 Aeacus
 Aeëtes
 Aegaeon
 Aegean civilization
 Aegeoneus
 Aegeus
 Aegeus (hero)
 Aegialeus (King of Argos)
 Aegialeus (King of Sicyon)
 Aegialeus (mythology)
 Aegialeus (strategos)
 Aegilia (Attica)
 Aegimius
 Aegipan
 Aegis
 Aegisthus
 Aegitium
 Aegium
 Aegius
 Aegle
 Aegospotami
 Aegys
 Aeimnestus
 Aeinautae
 Aelius Nicon
 Aeneas
 Aenesidemus
 Aeolians
 Aeolic Greek
 Aeolic order
 Aeolus
 Aeolus (Odyssey)
 Aeolus (son of Hellen)
 Aeolus (son of Poseidon)
 Aepytus
 Aerope
 Aesacus
 Aesara
 Aeschines
 Aeschines (physician)
 Aeschines of Sphettus
 Aeschylus
 Aeschylus of Rhodes
 Aeson
 Aesop
 Aesop's Fables
 Aesymnetes
 Aethalidae
 Aethalides
 Aether (classical element)
 Aether (mythology)
 Aethlius
 Aethon
 Aethra
 Aethra (mother of Theseus)
 Aetion
 Aetius (philosopher)
 Aetna
 Aetnaeus
 Aetolia
 Aetolian campaign
 Aetolian League
 Aetolian War
 Aetolus
 Aetolus of Aetolia
 Aexone
 Against Androtion
 Against Aristogeiton
 Against Eratosthenes
 Against Leptines
 Against Meidias
 Against Neaera
 Against Simon
 Against Spudias
 Against Stephanos
 Against the Sophists
 Against the Stepmother for Poisoning
 Against Timarchus
 Against Timocrates
 Agamede
 Agamedes
 Agamemnon
 Agamemnon (Zeus)
 Aganippe
 Aganippe (naiad)
 Agape
 Agapenor
 Agaptolemus
 Agasias, son of Menophilus
 Agasias of Arcadia
 Agasicles
 Agasthenes
 Agatharchides
 Agatharchus
 Agathodaemon
 Agathon
 Agathos kai sophos
 Agave
 Agdistis
 Agela
 Ageladas
 Agelaus
 Agenor
 Agenor (mythology)
 Agenor of Argos
 Agenor of Aetolia
 Agenor of Psophis
 Agenor of Troy
 Agenorides
 Agerochus
 Ages of Man
 Agesander of Rhodes
 Agesarchus of Tritaea
 Agesilaus I
 Agesilaus II
 Agesilaus (statesman)
 Agesilaus (Xenophon)
 Agesipolis I
 Agesipolis II
 Agesipolis III
 Agetor
 Agias of Sparta
 Agis I
 Agis II
 Agis III
 Agis IV
 Aglaea
 Aglaureion
 Aglaurus
 Aglaurus, daughter of Cecrops
 Agnaptus
 Agnodice
 Agoge
 Agon
 Agonius
 Agonothetes
 Agora
 Agora of the Competaliasts
 Agoracritus
 Agoraea
 Agoraios Kolonos
 Agoranomos
 Agoranomus
 Agreus and Nomios
 Agriculture in ancient Greece
 Agrionia
 Agrionius
 Agriopas
 Agrippa (astronomer)
 Agrius
 Agrius (son of Porthaon)
 Agrotera
 Agyieus
 Aiantis
 Aidoneus
 Aidos
 Ainis
 Aion
 Air (classical element)
 Aison (vase painter)
 Ajax (play)
 Ajax the Great
 Ajax the Lesser
 Akrotiri
 Akrotiri Boxer Fresco
 Alabandus
 Alabastron
 Alala
 Alalcomenae (Boeotia)
 Alalcomenes
 Alalcomenia
 Alastor
 Alazon
 Alcaeus
 Alcaeus and Philiscus
 Alcaeus of Mytilene
 Alcaic stanza
 Alcamenes
 Alcamenes, son of Sthenelaides
 Alcathous
 Alcathous of Elis
 Alces (mythology)
 Alcestis
 Alcibiades
 Alcidamas
 Alcidas
 Alcimachus of Apollonia
 Alcimedon
 Alcimus
 Alcinoe
 Alcinous
 Alcmaeon (mythology)
 Alcmaeon in Corinth
 Alcmaeon of Croton
 Alcmaeonidae
 Alcman
 Alcmaeon
 Alcmaeon, son of Megacles
 Alcmaeon of Athens
 Alcmene
 Alcmenes
 Alcmenor
 Alcmeonis
 Alcon
 Alcyone
 Alcyone (Pleiad)
 Alcyone and Ceyx
 Alcyoneus
 Alcyoneus (son of Diomos)
 Alea (Greek soldier)
 Alecto
 Alectryon
 Alepotrypa cave
 Aletes (Heraclid)
 Aletes of Mycenae
 Aletheia
 Aleuadae
 Aleuas
 Aleus
 Alexander (Aetolian general)
 Alexander (artists)
 Alexander of Pherae
 Alexander of Rhodes
 Alexander Sarcophagus
 Alexanor
 Alexiares and Anicetus
 Alexicacus
 Alexicles (general)
 Alexicrates
 Alexinus
 Alexippus
 Alexis (poet)
 Alexis (sculptor)
 Alexon
 Algos
 Alipherus
 Alkimachos of Pydna
 Allegory of the cave
 Almops
 Almus of Orchomenus
 Aloadae
 Alope
 Alope (spring)
 Alopece
 Alpha
 Alpheus (deity)
 Alpos
 Altamura Painter
 Altar of Athena Polias
 Altar of Hieron
 Altar of the Chians
 Altar of the Twelve Gods
 Altar of Zeus Agoraios
 Althaea
 Althaemenes
 Alypius of Alexandria
 Alypus
 Alytarches
 Alyzeus
 Amalthea (mythology)
 Amantes (tribe)
 Amarynceus
 Amasis Painter
 Amasis (potter)
 Amathusia
 Amazon statue types
 Amazonius
 Amazonomachy
 Amazons
 Ambracia
 Ambrax
 Ambrosia
 Ambryon
 Ambulia
 Amechania
 Ameinias of Athens
 Ameinocles
 Ameipsias
 Amentum
 Ammonius Saccas
 Amoebaean singing
 Amompharetus
 Ampersand Painter
 Amphiaraos Krater
 Amphiareion of Oropos
 Amphicleia
 Amphictyon
 Amphictyonic League
 Amphictyonis
 Amphidromia
 Amphillogiai
 Amphilochus I of Argos
 Amphilochus II of Argos
 Amphimachus I of Elis
 Amphimachus II of Elis
 Amphimachus of Caria
 Amphimachus of Mycenae
 Amphimedon
 Amphinome
 Amphinomus
 Amphion
 Amphion and Zethus
 Amphipole
 Amphiprostyle
 Amphirho
 Amphis
 Amphisbaena
 Amphithea
 Amphithemis
 Amphitrite
 Amphitryon
 Amphora
 Amphora (unit)
 Amphora of Hermonax in Würzburg
 Amphoterus (son of Alcmaeon)
 Ampyx
 Amulet MS 5236
 Amyclae
 Amyclas
 Amyclas of Sparta
 Amycus (centaur)
 Amydon
 Amykos
 Amykos Painter
 Amynomachus
 Amyntor
 Amythaon
 Anabasis (Xenophon)
 Anacaea
 Anacharsis
 Anacleteria
 Anacreon
 Anactor
 Anagnorisis
 Anagyrus Painter
 Anaideia
 Anakes
 Analatos Painter
 Analogy of the divided line
 Analogy of the sun
 Anamnesis
 Ananke
 Anaphlystus
 Anapos
 Anathyrosis
 Anax
 Anax (mythology)
 Anaxagoras
 Anaxagoras (mythology)
 Anaxagoras of Aegina
 Anaxander
 Anaxandra
 Anaxandridas I
 Anaxandridas II
 Anaxandrides
 Anaxarchus
 Anaxibia
 Anaxibius
 Anaxidamus
 Anaxilas (comic poet)
 Anaximander
 Anaximenes of Miletus
 Anaxippus
 Anaxis
 Anaxo
 Anaxo (daughter of Alcaeus)
 Ancaeus (son of Poseidon)
 Anchiale
 Anchialus
 Anchises
 Ancient accounts of Homer
 Ancient Agora of Athens
 Ancient Corinth
 Ancient Elis
 Ancient Greece
 Ancient Greece–Ancient India relations
 Ancient Greece and wine
 Ancient Greek
 Ancient Greek accent
 Ancient Greek architecture
 Ancient Greek art
 Ancient Greek astronomy
 Ancient Greek boxing
 Ancient Greek calendars
 Ancient Greek clubs
 Ancient Greek coinage
 Ancient Greek comedy
 Ancient Greek conditional clauses
 Ancient Greek cuisine
 Ancient Greek dialects
 Ancient Greek flood myths
 Ancient Greek folklore
 Ancient Greek funeral and burial practices
 Ancient Greek funerary vases
 Ancient Greek grammar
 Ancient Greek law
 Ancient Greek literature
 Ancient Greek medicine
 Ancient Greek mercenaries
 Ancient Greek military personal equipment
 Ancient Greek Musical Notation
 Ancient Greek nouns
 Ancient Greek novel
 Ancient Greek Numbers (Unicode block)
 Ancient Greek Olympic festivals
 Ancient Greek personal names
 Ancient Greek philosophy
 Ancient Greek phonology
 Ancient Greek present progressive markers
 Ancient Greek religion
 Ancient Greek sculpture
 Ancient Greek technology
 Ancient Greek temple
 Ancient Greek units of measurement
 Ancient Greek verbs
 Ancient Greek warfare
 Ancient harbour of Samos
 Ancient history of Cyprus
 Ancient Macedonian army
 Ancient Macedonian language
 Ancient Magnesia
 Ancient Olympic Games
 Ancient Olympic pentathlon
 Ancient Theatre of Epidaurus
 Ancient theatre of Taormina
 Ancient Thera
 Ancient Thessaly
 Ancyle
 Andokides (potter)
 Andokides (vase painter)
 Andraemon
 Andragathus
 Androcleides
 Androcydes (painter)
 Androdamas
 Androetas
 Androgeos
 Androgeus (Aeneid)
 Androgeus (son of Minos)
 Androlepsy
 Andromache
 Andromache (play)
 Andromachus
 Andromeda
 Andron
 Andron (physician)
 Andronicus of Rhodes
 Andropompus
 Androtion
 Androtion (historian)
 Anemoi
 Aneristus
 Angele (deme)
 Angelitos Athena
 Angelos
 Anius
 Anniceris
 Anonymus Londinensis
 Anta
 Anta capital
 Antae temple
 Antaea
 Antaeus
 Antaeus (physician)
 Antalcidas
 Antefix
 Anteias
 Antenor
 Antenor (mythology)
 Antenor of Troy
 Antenor (writer)
 Antenor Kore
 Antenorides
 Antepredicament
 Anteros
 Anthas
 Anthedon (Boeotia)
 Antheia
 Anthesphoria
 Anthesteria
 Antheus
 Anthippus
 Anthousai
 Anticlea
 Anticlus
 Anticrates
 Antigenes
 Antigenes (historian)
 Antigone
 Antigone (mythology)
 Antigone (Euripides play)
 Antigone (Sophocles play)
 Antigonia
 Antigonid dynasty
 Antigonid Macedonian army
 Antigonid–Nabataean confrontations
 Antigonus (historian)
 Antigonus (mythology)
 Antigonus (physician)
 Antigonus (sculptor)
 Antigonus of Carystus
 Antikyra
 Antikythera
 Antikythera Ephebe
 Antikythera mechanism
 Antikythera wreck
 Antilochus
 Antilochus (historian)
 Antimachia
 Antimachus
 Antimachus (sculptor)
 Antimenes Painter
 Antimoerus
 Antinoeis
 Antinous of Ithaca
 Antiochis (tribe)
 Antiochus (admiral)
 Antiochus (mythology)
 Antiochus (physician)
 Antiochus (sculptor)
 Antiochus of Arcadia
 Antiochus of Ascalon
 Antiope
 Antiope (Amazon)
 Antipater
 Antipater (astrologer)
 Antipater of Acanthus
 Antipater of Cyrene
 Antipater of Sidon
 Antipater of Tarsus
 Antipater of Tyre
 Antipatitis
 Antipatrid dynasty
 Antiperistasis
 Antiphanes (comic poet)
 Antiphanes of Argos
 Antiphates
 Antiphemus
 Antiphilus
 Antiphon (brother of Plato)
 Antiphon (orator)
 Antiphon (tragic poet)
 Antiphon (writer)
 Antiphon Painter
 Antiphonus
 Antiphus
 Antisthenes
 Antisthenes (Heraclitean)
 Antisthenes of Rhodes
 Antisthenes of Sparta
 Antistrophe
 Antonius
 Antonius of Argos
 Antorides
 Anyte of Tegea
 Anytos
 Anytus
 Aoede
 Aoidos
 Aon
 Aorist
 Aorist (Ancient Greek)
 Aornum
 Apanchomene
 Apate
 Apatheia
 Apaturia
 Apaturia (Greek mythology)
 Apaturius
 Apega of Nabis
 Apeiron
 Apella
 Apellai
 Apellaia
 Apellas
 Apelles
 Apemius
 Apesantius
 Aphareus
 Aphareus (writer)
 Aphareus of Messenia
 Apheidas
 Aphidna
 Aphneius
 Aphrodisia
 Aphrodite
 Aphrodite of Knidos
 Aphrodite of the Gardens
 Aphrodite Pandemos
 Aphrodite Urania
 Aphroditus
 Apis (Greek mythology)
 Apis of Argos
 Apis of Sicyon
 Apobates Base
 Apocatastasis
 Apodektai
 Apodicticity
 Apollo
 Apollo and Daphne
 Apollo Citharoedus
 Apollo of Mantua
 Apollo of Piombino
 Apollodoros (vase painter)
 Apollodorus (general)
 Apollodorus (painter)
 Apollodorus (sculptor)
 Apollodorus Logisticus
 Apollodorus of Acharnae
 Apollodorus of Athens
 Apollodorus of Boeotia
 Apollodorus of Carystus
 Apollodorus of Cyrene
 Apollodorus of Erythrae
 Apollodorus of Phaleron
 Apollodorus of Seleucia
 Apollodorus of Tarsus
 Apollonian and Dionysian
 Apollonides (governor of Argos)
 Apollonides (philosopher)
 Apollonides of Boeotia
 Apollonides of Cardia
 Apollonides of Cos
 Apollonides of Smyrna
 Apollonides of Sparta
 Apollonieis
 Apollonis
 Apollonius
 Apollonius Cronus
 Apollonius Molon
 Apollonius of Acharnae
 Apollonius of Aphrodisias
 Apollonius of Chalcedon
 Apollonius of Clazomenae
 Apollonius of Laodicea
 Apollonius of Perga
 Apollonius of Tyana
 Apollonius (son of Archias)
 Apollonius (son of Chaeris)
 Apollothemis
 Apology (Xenophon)
 Apomyius
 Aponia
 Apophantic
 Aporia
 Apotropaei
 Apotrophia
 Apoxyomenos
 Apple of Discord
 Apsines
 Apulian vase painting
 Arabius (mythology)
 Aracus (admiral)
 Arae
 Araphen
 Araros
 Aratus of Sicyon
 Arbius
 Arcadia
 Arcadian League
 Arcadocypriot Greek
 Arcas
 Arcesilaus
 Arcesilaus (mythology)
 Arcesius
 Archaeological Park of Dion
 Archaeological site of Terpsithea Square
 Archaic Greece
 Archaic Greek alphabets
 Archaic smile
 Arche
 Arche (mythology)
 Archedicus
 Archegetes
 Archelaus (geographer)
 Archelaus (Heraclid)
 Archelaus (philosopher)
 Archelaus (play)
 Archelaus Chersonesita
 Archelaus of Sparta
 Archelochus
 Archemachus
 Archemachus of Euboea
 Archermus
 Archestratus
 Archestratus (general)
 Archestratus (music theorist)
 Archias of Corinth
 Archidamus (physician)
 Archidamus I
 Archidamus II
 Archidamus III
 Archidamus IV
 Archidamus V
 Archilochus
 Archimedes
 Archimedes Palimpsest
 Archimelus
 Archinus
 Archinus (historian)
 Archon
 Archon basileus
 Archytas
 Archytas of Mytilene 
 Ardalus
 Ardeas
 Aregon
 Areopagite constitution
 Areopagus
 Ares
 Ares Borghese
 Aresas
 Arestor
 Arete
 Arete (mythology)
 Aretes of Dyrrachium
 Arethusa
 Aretology
 Areus I
 Areus II
 Arezzo 1465 vase
 Argalus
 Arge
 Arges (Cyclops)
 Argeus of Argos
 Argia
 Argileonis
 Argiope
 Argius
 Argive vase painting
 Argo
 Argonautica
 Argonautica Orphica
 Argonauts
 Argos
 Argos (dog)
 Argos panoply
 Argos Theater
 Argus (Argonaut)
 Argus (Greek myth)
 Argus (king of Argos)
 Argus Panoptes
 Agryle
 Argyramoiboi
 Argyraspides
 Argyrocopeum
 Arignote
 Arimaspi
 Arimneste
 Arimnestos
 Arimoi
 Arion
 Arion (mythology)
 Ariphron
 Arisbas
 Arisbe
 Aristaeus
 Aristaeus the Elder
 Aristagoras
 Aristander of Paros
 Aristarchus of Athens
 Aristarchus of Colchis
 Aristarchus of Samos
 Aristarchus of Samothrace
 Aristarchus of Sparta
 Aristarchus of Tegea
 Aristeas (sculptor)
 Aristeia
 Aristeides
 Aristeus
 Aristias
 Aristides
 Aristides of Thebes
 Aristion
 Aristion (physician)
 Aristippus
 Aristippus of Larissa
 Aristippus the Younger
 Aristo of Ceos
 Aristocleidas
 Aristocleides
 Aristocles (sculptors)
 Aristocles of Messene
 Aristocracy
 Aristodemus
 Aristodemus of Cydathenaeum
 Aristodemus of Miletus
 Aristodemus of Sparta
 Aristogeiton (orator)
 Aristoi
 Aristolaos
 Aristomachos of Argos
 Aristomachus
 Aristomenes
 Ariston (painter)
 Ariston of Athens
 Ariston of Sparta
 Aristonymus
 Aristophanes
 Aristophanes (vase painter)
 Aristophanes of Byzantium
 Aristophon (comic poet)
 Aristotelian ethics
 Aristotelianism
 Aristotle
 Aristotle's biology
 Aristotle's theory of universals
 Aristotle's views on women
 Aristotle's wheel paradox
 Aristotle of Cyrene
 Aristoxenus
 Aristoxenus (physician)
 Arithmetica
 Arius Didymus
 Arkalochori Axe
 Arkesilas Cup
 Arkesilas Painter
 Arnaeus
 Arrephorion
 Arrephoros
 Arrhephoria
 Arrhichion
 Arrian
 Arsinoe
 Arsis and thesis
 Artas of Messapia
 Artemidorus
 Artemis
 Artemision Bronze
 Arundel marbles
 Arura
 Aryballos
 Asbolus
 Ascalaphus
 Ascalaphus (son of Acheron)
 Ascalaphus of Orchomenus
 Ascanius
 Asclepiad (title)
 Asclepiades of Phlius
 Asclepiades the Cynic
 Asclepiodorus (painter)
 Asclepiodotus (philosopher)
 Asclepeion
 Asclepius
 Ascolia
 Asebeia
 Asia (mythology)
 Asine (Messenia)
 Asius
 Asius of Samos
 Asklepieion of Athens
 Askos
 Asopis
 Asphodel Meadows
 Aspis
 Astacus (mythology)
 Asteas
 Asteria (Titaness)
 Asterion (god)
 Asterion (king of Crete)
 Asterius
 Asterodia
 Asteropaios
 Asterope
 Asterope (Hesperid)
 Astomi
 Astra Planeta
 Astraea
 Astraeus
 Astraeus (mythology)
 Astris
 Astronomical rings
 Asty
 Astyanax
 Astydameia
 Astylochus
 Astymedusa
 Astynomus
 Astynous
 Atalanta
 Atas
 Ateleia
 Atene (deme)
 Athamanians
 Athena
 Athena Alea
 Athena Alkidemos
 Athena Areia
 Athena Painter
 Athena Parthenos
 Athena Promachos
 Athenaeus
 Athenaeus (musician)
 Athenaeus Mechanicus
 Athenian Band Cup by the Oakeshott Painter (MET 17.230.5)
 Athenian coinage decree
 Athenian coup of 411 BC
 Athenian democracy
 Athenian festivals
 Athenian Grain-Tax Law of 374/3 B.C.
 Athenian military
 Athenian Revolution
 Athenian sacred ships
 Athenian Treasury
 Athenians Project
 Athenion of Maroneia
 Athenodorus Cananites
 Athenodorus of Soli
 Athens
 Atheradas of Laconia
 Athmonum
 Athos
 Atimia
 Atintanians
 Atlantis
 Atlas (architecture)
 Atlas (mythology)
 Atomism
 Atrax (mythology)
 Atrax (Thessaly)
 Atreus
 Atropos
 Attaginus
 Attalid dynasty
 Attalus (general)
 Attalus of Rhodes
 Atthidographer
 Attic calendar
 Attic declension
 Attic Greek
 Attic helmet
 Attic numerals
 Attic orators
 Attic talent
 Attic War
 Attic weight
 Attica
 Atticism
 Atticus (philosopher)
 Attis
 Atymnius
 Atys (son of Croesus)
 Atys of Lydia
 Augeas
 Aulis
 Auloniad
 Aulos
 Aura (mythology)
 Auridae
 Autariatae
 Autesion
 Autochthe
 Autochthon
 Autokrator
 Autolycus
 Autolycus of Pitane
 Automedon
 Autonoe (mythology)
 Autonoë of Thebes
 Autonous
 Axiochus (Alcmaeonid)
 Axiochus (dialogue)
 Axion
 Axiotta
 Axylus
 Azan (mythology)
 Azania
 Azenia (Attica)
 Azone

B 

 Babys
 Bacchiadae
 Bacchius of Tanagra
 Bacchoi
 Bacchylides
 Baiake
 Bakis
 Balius and Xanthus
 Ballista
 Baltimore Painter
 Banausos
 Band cup
 Band skyphos
 Baptes
 Barbiton
 Barytone
 Basileus
 Basilides (Stoic)
 Basilides of Tyre
 Basilides the Epicurean
 Basilinna
 Bassaris
 Bate (Attica)
 Batea
 Bathonea
 Bathycles
 Bathycles of Magnesia
 Batiae
 Batis of Lampsacus
 Batrachomyomachia
 Battiadae
 Battle of Abydos
 Battle of Aegina
 Battle of Aegospotami
 Battle of Alalia
 Battle of Amorgos
 Battle of Amphipolis
 Battle of Arginusae
 Battle of Artemisium
 Battle of Asculum
 Battle of Beneventum (275 BC)
 Battle of Byzantium
 Battle of Catana (397 BC)
 Battle of Chaeronea (338 BC)
 Battle of Chios (201 BC)
 Battle of Cnidus
 Battle of Corinth (146 BC)
 Battle of Coronea (394 BC)
 Battle of Coronea (447 BC)
 Battle of Corupedium
 Battle of Crannon
 Battle of Cretopolis
 Battle of Crocus Field
 Battle of Cumae
 Battle of Cunaxa
 Battle of Cynoscephalae (364 BC)
 Battle of Cynoscephalae
 Battle of Cynossema
 Battle of Cyzicus
 Battle of Delium
 Battle of Deres
 Battle of Dyme
 Battle of Embata
 Battle of Ephesus (ca. 258 BC)
 Battle of Eretria
 Battle of Gabiene
 Battle of Gaugamela
 Battle of Gaza (312 BC)
 Battle of Haliartus
 Battle of Heraclea
 Battle of Himera (409 BC)
 Battle of Himera (480 BC)
 Battle of Hysiae (417 BC)
 Battle of Hysiae (c.669 BC)
 Battle of Idomene
 Battle of Ipsus
 Battle of Issus
 Battle of Lade
 Battle of Lade (201 BC)
 Battle of Lechaeum
 Battle of Leontion
 Battle of Leuctra
 Battle of Lyncestis
 Battle of Lysimachia
 Battle of Mantinea (207 BC)
 Battle of Mantinea (362 BC)
 Battle of Mantinea (418 BC)
 Battle of Marathon
 Battle of Megalopolis
 Battle of Megara
 Battle of Mount Lycaeum
 Battle of Munychia
 Battle of Mycale
 Battle of Myonessus
 Battle of Mytilene (406 BC)
 Battle of Naupactus
 Battle of Naxos
 Battle of Nemea
 Battle of Notium
 Battle of Oenophyta
 Battle of Olpae
 Battle of Orkynia
 Battle of Orneae
 Battle of Pandosia
 Battle of Paraitakene
 Battle of Paxos
 Battle of Pharos
 Battle of Phoenice
 Battle of Phyle
 Battle of Piraeus
 Battle of Plataea
 Battle of Plataea (323 BC)
 Battle of Potidaea
 Battle of Pydna
 Battle of Pylos
 Battle of Raphia
 Battle of Rhium
 Battle of Salamis
 Battle of Salamis (306 BC)
 Battle of Scarpheia
 Battle of Sellasia
 Battle of Sepeia
 Battle of Spartolos
 Battle of Sphacteria
 Battle of Sybota
 Battle of Syme
 Battle of Tanagra (426 BC)
 Battle of Tanagra (457 BC)
 Battle of Tegyra
 Battle of Thebes
 Battle of Thermopylae
 Battle of Thermopylae (279 BC)
 Battle of Thermopylae (323 BC)
 Battle of the Echinades (322 BC)
 Battle of the Eurymedon
 Battle of the Eurymedon (190 BC)
 Battle of the Granicus
 Battle of the Hellespont (321 BC)
 Battle of the Hydaspes
 Battle of the 300 Champions
 Battle of the Fetters
 Battle of the Great Foss
 Battle of the Strait of Messina
 Battle of the Tigris
 Battus
 Baubo
 Baucis and Philemon
 Belbina (Argolis)
 Beldam Painter
 Belemina
 Bellerophon
 Bellerophon Painter
 Bellerophon (play)
 Belly Amphora by the Andokides Painter (Munich 2301)
 Bema
 Bema of Phaidros
 Bematist
 Bembina (Argolis)
 Bendidia
 Bene (Crete)
 Boeotian muses
 Berenice (Epirus)
 Berenicidae
 Berlin Foundry Cup
 Berlin Painter
 Beroe
 Besa (Attica)
 Bessa (Locris)
 Beta
 Between Scylla and Charybdis
 Bia
 Biannus
 Bias
 Bias (son of Amythaon)
 Bias of Priene
 Bibliotheca (Pseudo-Apollodorus)
 Bident
 Bienor
 Bilingual kylix by the Andokides painter
 Bilingual vase painting
 Bion of Abdera
 Bion of Borysthenes
 Bionnus
 Bireme
 Bisaltae
 Bisaltes
 Biston
 Bistonis
 Biton of Pergamon
 Black-figure pottery
 Black-glazed Ware
 Black soup
 Blond Kouros's Head of the Acropolis
 BMN Painter
 Boar's tusk helmet
 Boebe (Thessaly)
 Boedromia
 Boeotarch
 Boeotia
 Boeotian Dancer's Group Kothon, Black Figure Tripod, 6th Century B.C.
 Boeotian helmet
 Boeotian shield
 Boeotian Treasury
 Boeotian vase painting
 Boeotian War
 Boeotus
 Boeotus (son of Poseidon)
 Boeotus of Sicyon
 Boethus
 Boethus of Sidon (Stoic)
 Boios
 Boium
 Bolbe
 Bolina
 Bolina (Achaea)
 Bomolochus
 Book of Lemmas
 Boreads
 Borghese Gladiator
 Borghese Vase
 Bormus
 Borus
 Borysthenes
 Borysthenis
 Bosporan Kingdom
 Botres
 Bottiaea
 Boudeion
 Boukris
 Boule
 Bouleuterion
 Bouleutic oath
 Bounos
 Boustrophedon
 Bouzyges
 Bowl of Hygieia
 Boxer Stele Fragment from Kerameikos
 Boxing Siana Cup
 Brachyllas
 Branchus (lover of Apollo)
 Brangas
 Brasidas
 Brauroneion
 Brea (Thrace)
 Bremon
 Bremusa
 Brimo
 Briseis
 Briseus
 Britomartis
 Brizo
 Bromius
 Brontinus
 Bronze Diskos Thrower Statue
 Bronze Statuette of Athletic Spartan Girl
 Broteas
 Brothers Poem
 Bryaxis
 Brycus
 Brygos
 Brygos cup of Würzburg
 Brygos Painter
 Bryn Mawr Painter
 Bryseae
 Bryson of Achaea
 Bryson of Heraclea
 Buchetium
 Bucolion
 Bucolus
 Budeia
 Bularchus
 Bull-Leaping Fresco
 Bull of the Corcyreans
 Bupalus and Athenis
 Buphagus
 Buphonia
 Buprasium
 Bura
 Burgon Group
 Burgon vase
 Buskin
 Butadae
 Butades
 Butes
 Bybon
 Byzantium
 Byzas

C 

 C Painter
 Caanthus
 Cabeiri
 Cabeiro
 Cadmea
 Cadmean victory
 Cadmus
 Cadmus of Miletus
 Caduceus
 Caduceus as a symbol of medicine
 Caeneus
 Caeretan hydria
 Caerus
 Calamis (4th century BC)
 Calamis (5th century BC)
 Calathus (basket)
 Calchas
 Calesius
 Caletor
 Caliadne
 Callias III
 Callichore
 Callicles
 Callicrates
 Callicrates of Sparta
 Callicratidas
 Callidice
 Callimachus (polemarch)
 Callimedon
 Callinus
 Calliope
 Calliphon
 Calliphon of Croton
 Callippides
 Callippus
 Callippus of Syracuse
 Callirhoe (mythology)
 Callirrhoe (daughter of Achelous)
 Callirrhoe (Oceanid)
 Callisthenes
 Callisto
 Callistratus (grammarian)
 Callithyia
 Callixenus
 Calyce
 Calydnus
 Calydon
 Calydon of Aetolia
 Calydoneus
 Calydonian boar hunt
 Calypso (mythology)
 Calyx-Krater by the artist called the Painter of the Berlin Hydria depicting an Amazonomachy
 Cameirus (mythology)
 Campanian vase painting
 Campe
 Canace
 Canachus
 Candalus
 Candaon
 Candaules
 Canephoria
 Canethus
 Canopus
 Canosa vases
 Canthus
 Cap of invisibility
 Capaneus
 Cape Matapan
 Capture of Oechalia
 Capys of Dardania
 Car (Greek myth)
 Car of Caria
 Carcinus (writer)
 Cardamyle
 Cardia (Thrace)
 Carius
 Carmanor (of Crete)
 Carmanor (son of Dionysus)
 Carme (mythology)
 Carneades
 Carneia
 Carneiscus
 Carnus
 Carpaea
 Carpus of Antioch
 Caryae
 Caryatid
 Caryatis
 Carystius
 Carystus
 Cassandra
 Cassandra (metaphor)
 Cassandreia
 Cassiopeia (mother of Andromeda)
 Cassopaei
 Cassope
 Cassotis
 Castalia
 Castellani Painter
 Castor of Rhodes
 Catalogue of Ships
 Catalogue of Women
 Catamite
 Catastasis
 Categories (Aristotle)
 Catharsis
 Catoptrics
 Catreus
 Cattle of Helios
 Caucon
 Caucones
 Caunos (mythology)
 Cavalcade Painter
 Cave of Euripides
 Cave Sanctuaries of the Akropolis
 Cebes
 Cebren
 Cebriones
 Cecrops
 Cecrops I
 Cecrops II
 Cedalion
 Cedi (Attica)
 Celaeneus
 Celaeno
 Celaeno (Pleiad)
 Celaenus (mythology)
 Celestial spheres
 Celeus
 Cella
 Celtine
 Celtus
 Centaur
 Centaurides
 Central Greece
 Centuripe ware
 Cephale
 Cephalion
 Cephalus
 Cephalus of Athens
 Cephalus of Phocis
 Cepheus (father of Andromeda)
 Cepheus (king of Tegea)
 Cephisia
 Cephisodorus
 Cephisodotus (general)
 Cephisodotus the Elder
 Cephisodotus the Younger
 Cephisso
 Cephissus
 Cerambus
 Cerameicus Painter
 Cerameis
 Ceraon
 Cerastes
 Cerberus
 Cercaphus
 Cercaphus (Heliadae)
 Cercetes
 Cercidas
 Cercopes
 Cercopes (epic poem)
 Cercops
 Cercyon
 Cercyon of Eleusis
 Cerdo (mythology)
 Ceremonies of ancient Greece
 Ceriadae
 Cerinthus (Euboea)
 Ceroessa
 Ceryneian Hind
 Ceryx
 Cestria (Epirus)
 Cestrinus
 Ceto
 Ceto (Greek myth)
 Cettus
 Cetus
 Ceuthonymus
 Ceyx of Trachis
 Chabrias
 Chaeremon
 Chaeremon of Alexandria
 Chaerephon
 Chaeresilaus
 Chaeron of Pellene
 Chaeronea
 Chaetus
 Chalandriani
 Chalceia
 Chalcidian helmet
 Chalcidianising cup
 Chalciope
 Chalcis
 Chalcis (Aetolia)
 Chalcis (Epirus)
 Chalcis Decree
 Chalcodon
 Chalcon
 Chaldean Oracles
 Chalkaspides
 Chalkidian pottery
 Chalkidiki
 Chalkotheke
 Chamaeleon (philosopher)
 Chaon
 Chaonia
 Chaonians
 Chaos
 Charadra (Epirus)
 Charadra (Messenia)
 Charadra (Phocis)
 Chares of Athens
 Chares of Lindos
 Charicles
 Chariclo
 Charidemus
 Charilaus
 Chariot Allegory
 Charioteer of Delphi
 Charis (mythology)
 Charisticary
 Charites
 Charitimides
 Charition mime
 Chariton
 Charixene
 Charmadas
 Charmides
 Charmides (dialogue)
 Charmus
 Charnabon
 Charon
 Charon's obol
 Charondas
 Charops
 Charybdis
 Chastieis
 Chatsworth Head
 Cheirisophus (general)
 Chelys
 Cheramyes
 Chersias
 Chersiphron
 Chi (letter)
 Chian wine
 Chigi vase
 Children of Heracles
 Chiliarch
 Chilon of Patras
 Chilon of Sparta
 Chion of Heraclea
 Chione
 Chione (daughter of Arcturus)
 Chione (daughter of Boreas)
 Chione (daughter of Callirrhoe)
 Chionides
 Chionis of Sparta
 Chios
 Chios (Caria)
 Chirimachus
 Chiron
 Chiton
 Chiusi Painter
 Chlamys
 Chloris
 Chloris (nymph)
 Chloris of Thebes
 Choerilus (playwright)
 Choerilus of Samos
 Cholargos (deme)
 Cholleidae
 Choragic Monument of Nikias
 Choragic Monument of Thrasyllos
 Choral poetry
 Choreia
 Chorizontes
 Chorus of the elderly in classical Greek drama
 Chremonidean War
 Chrestomathy
 Chromia
 Chromis
 Chromius
 Chronology of ancient Greek mathematicians
 Chronos
 Chrysanthis
 Chrysaor
 Chryse (Lesbos)
 Chryse (mythology)
 Chryse (ancient Greek placename)
 Chryseis
 Chryseis (mythology)
 Chryselephantine sculpture
 Chryselephantine statues at Delphi
 Chryses (mythology)
 Chryses of Troy
 Chrysippe
 Chrysippus
 Chrysippus (Greek myth)
 Chrysippus of Cnidos
 Chrysippus of Elis
 Chrysis Painter
 Chrysogonus of Athens
 Chrysondyon
 Chrysothemis
 Chrysus
 Chthonia
 Chthonic
 Chthonius
 Cicynna
 Cilix
 Cilla
 Cilla (city)
 Cimon
 Cimon Coalemos
 Cimon of Cleonae
 Cinaethon of Sparta
 Cineas
 Cineas (Athenian)
 Cinyras
 Cipollino marble
 Circe
 Cisseus
 Cistophorus
 Cisus
 Cissus (mythology)
 Cithara
 Citharode
 City walls of Athens
 Class of Cabinet des Médailles 218
 Classical Greece
 Classical mythology
 Classical order
 Classical sculpture
 Claw of Archimedes
 Cleander of Gela
 Cleander of Sparta
 Cleandridas
 Cleanthes
 Cleanthes (artist)
 Clearchus of Rhegium
 Clearchus of Soli
 Clearchus of Sparta
 Cleidemus
 Cleinias
 Cleinias of Tarentum
 Cleisthenes
 Cleisthenes (son of Sibyrtius)
 Cleitagora
 Cleite
 Cleitus the Black
 Cleitus the White
 Cleobule
 Cleobulina
 Cleobulus
 Cleocharia
 Cleodaeus
 Cleodora (nymph)
 Cleodorus
 Cleolaus
 Cleolla
 Cleomachus
 Cleombrotus I
 Cleombrotus II
 Cleombrotus (regent)
 Cleombrotus of Ambracia
 Cleomedes
 Cleomenean War
 Cleomenes I
 Cleomenes II
 Cleomenes III
 Cleomenes (seer)
 Cleomenes the Cynic
 Cleon 
 Cleon (mythology)
 Cleon (sculptor)
 Cleonaeus
 Cleondas of Thebes
 Cleonides
 Cleonymus of Athens
 Cleonymus of Sparta
 Cleopatra (Danaid)
 Cleophon (poet)
 Cleophon (politician)
 Cleostratus
 Cleruchy
 Climacteric year
 Clinomachus
 Clio
 Clio (mythology)
 Clipeus
 Clitomachus (philosopher)
 Clitophon (Athenian)
 Clitophon (dialogue)
 Clitorians
 Clonia (nymph)
 Clonius
 Clothing in ancient Greece
 Clotho
 Clymene (mother of Phaethon)
 Clymene
 Clymene (wife of Iapetus)
 Clymenus
 Clytemnestra
 Clytie
 Clytie (Oceanid)
 Clytius
 Clytus
 Cnemus
 Cnidian Treasury
 Coa vestis
 Coan wine
 Coastal Lamptrai
 Cocalus
 Cocytus
 Codrus
 Codrus Painter
 Coele
 Coeranus
 Coeratadas
 Coes of Mytilene
 Coinage of Side
 Coinage of the Social War (91–88 BC)
 Colaeus
 Collytus
 Colonae (Leontis)
 Colonides
 Colonus (Attica)
 Colophon
 Colossus of Rhodes
 Colossus of the Naxians
 Colotes
 Columbus Painter
 Comaetho
 Comast Group
 Combe
 Cometas
 Cometes
 Common Peace
 Companion cavalry
 Comus
 Concentric spheres
 Congress at the Isthmus of Corinth
 Congress of Gela
 Conisterium
 Conon
 Conon (mythographer)
 Conon of Samos
 Conservation and restoration of ancient Greek pottery
 Conspiracy of Cinadon
 Constitution of the Athenians (Pseudo-Xenophon)
 Constitution of the Lacedaemonians
 Constitution of the Athenians (Aristotle)
 Contest of Cithaeron and Helicon
 Contest of Homer and Hesiod
 Conthyle
 Contrapposto
 Controversia
 Coön
 Copae
 Copreus (mythology)
 Copreus of Elis
 Coprus
 Corax of Syracuse
 Cordax
 Coresus
 Corinthian bronze
 Corinthian helmet
 Corinthian order
 Corinthian War
 Corinthus
 Coriscus of Scepsis
 Corium (Crete)
 Coroebus
 Coroebus of Elis
 Coronaeus
 Corone (crow)
 Corone (Messenia)
 Coroneia (Boeotia)
 Coronis
 Coronis (lover of Apollo)
 Coronis (textual symbol)
 Coronus
 Coroplast (artisan)
 Corpus Aristotelicum
 Corus (mythology)
 Corybas (mythology)
 Corycia
 Corydallus
 Coryphaeus
 Corythus
 Cothocidae
 Cotyla
 Cotyttia
 Counter-Earth
 Cragaleus
 Cranaus
 Crantor
 Crantor (mythology)
 Craterus' ex voto
 Crates (engineer)
 Crates of Athens
 Crates of Mallus
 Crates of Thebes
 Crateuas (physician)
 Cratinus
 Cratippus of Athens
 Cratippus of Pergamon
 Cratylus
 Cratylus (dialogue)
 Creon (king of Corinth)
 Creon (king of Thebes)
 Creonion
 Creophylus of Samos
 Crepidoma
 Cres
 Cresphontes
 Crestonia
 Cretan archers
 Cretan Bull
 Cretan War (205–200 BC)
 Crete
 Crete (mythology)
 Cretea
 Cretheus
 Crethon
 Creusa
 Creusa (Naiad)
 Creusa of Athens
 Creusa of Corinth
 Creusa of Troy
 Criasus
 Crinacus
 Crinaeae
 Crinagoras of Mytilene
 Crinis
 Crino
 Crioa (Attica)
 Crissa
 Crisus
 Critheïs
 Crithote (Thrace)
 Critias
 Critias (dialogue)
 Crito
 Crito of Alopece
 Critodemus
 Critolaos of Megalopolis
 Critolaus
 Criton of Heraclea
 Criton of Pieria
 Crius
 Croatian Apoxyomenos
 Crobylus
 Crocus (mythology)
 Croeseid
 Croesus
 Crommyonian Sow
 Cropia (Attica)
 Crotalum
 Crotopus
 Crouching Satyr Eye-Cup
 Crypteia
 Ctesias
 Ctesibius
 Ctesicles
 Ctesilochus
 Ctesippus
 Ctimene
 Cuarius (Boeotia)
 Cult of Artemis at Brauron
 Cult of Dionysus
 Cultural depictions of Medusa and Gorgons
 Cumae
 Curetes (tribe)
 Cyamites
 Cyaneae
 Cyanippus
 Cybele
 Cychreides
 Cychreus
 Cycliadas
 Cyclic Poets
 Cyclopean masonry
 Cyclopes
 Cyclops (play)
 Cycnus
 Cycnus of Aetolia
 Cycnus of Kolonai
 Cycnus of Liguria
 Cycnus (son of Ares)
 Cydantidae
 Cydathenaeum
 Cydias
 Cydon
 Cylarabes
 Cylix of Apollo
 Cyllarus
 Cyllene (Elis)
 Cyllene (nymph)
 Cylon of Athens
 Cynaegirus
 Cynaethus
 Cynegeticus
 Cynicism (philosophy)
 Cynisca
 Cynortas
 Cynosarges
 Cynosura (Laconia)
 Cynurus
 Cynus
 Cyparissus
 Cyparissus (Phocis)
 Cyphus
 Cypria
 Cypriot Bichrome ware
 Cypselus
 Cyrenaics
 Cyrene
 Cyropaedia
 Cythera
 Cytherus
 Cytinium
 Cytissorus
 Cytorus
 Cyzicus

D 

 Dactyls
 Daduchos
 Daedala
 Daedalidae
 Daedalion
 Daedalus
 Daemon
 Daemones Ceramici
 Daetor
 Daidala
 Daiphron
 Demaratus
 Damarchus
 Damasen
 Damasichthon
 Damasichthon (King of Thebes)
 Damasithymus
 Damastor
 Demetrius of Phalerum
 Damo
 Damocles
 Damocrates
 Demodocus (dialogue)
 Damon and Pythias
 Damon of Athens
 Damysus
 Danaë
 Danaïdes
 Danake
 Danaus
 Dancer of Pergamon
 Dancers of Delphi
 Dancing Satyr of Mazara del Vallo
 Dandes of Argos
 Daphnaie
 Daphne
 Daphnephoria
 Daphnis
 Daphnus
 Dardanian invasion of Epirus
 Dardanians
 Dardanus
 Dardanus of Athens
 Dardanus (Scythian king)
 Dardanus (son of Zeus)
 Dares Phrygius
 Darius Painter
 Darius Vase
 Dascylium (Caria)
 Dascylus
 Dexaroi
 Data (Euclid)
 Daulis
 Daulis (mythology)
 Daybreak Painter
 De genio Socratis
 De Interpretatione
 Death in ancient Greek art
 Decelea
 Deception of Zeus
 Declension of Greek nouns in Latin
 Decline of Greco-Roman polytheism
 Decree of Aristoteles
 Decree of Dionysopolis
 Decree of Philippi
 Decree of Philippi, 242 BCE
 Decree of Themistocles
 Dedication of Nikandre
 Defeat of Leonnatus by Antiphilus
 Deferent and epicycle
 Definitions (Plato)
 Deianira
 Deidamia (Greek myth)
 Deidamia of Scyros
 Deileon
 Deimachus
 Deimachus (mythology)
 Deimos (deity)
 Deinomenes
 Deiochus
 Deioneus
 Deiopites
 Deiphobus
 Deiphontes
 Deipneus
 Deipnon
 Deipylus
 Deipyrus
 Deiradiotae
 Delian League
 Delium
 Delos
 Delphi
 Delphi Inscription
 Delphic Hymns
 Delphic maxims
 Delphic Sibyl
 Delphinia
 Delphinion
 Delphus
 Delphyne
 Delta (letter)
 Demaenetus
 Demaratus
 Demarchos
 Deme
 Demeter
 Demeter of Knidos
 Demetrius (somatophylax)
 Demetrius (son of Althaemenes)
 Demetrius (son of Pythonax)
 Demetrius of Alopece
 Demetrius of Amphipolis
 Demetrius of Magnesia
 Demetrius of Phalerum
 Demetrius of Scepsis
 Demetrius the Cynic
 Demetrius Lacon
 Demiurge
 Demiurge (magistrate)
 Democedes
 Demochares
 Democles
 Democoon
 Democrates
 Democrates of Aphidna
 Democritus
 Demodocus
 Demoleon
 Demoleon (mythology)
 Demoleus
 Demonax
 Demonax (lawmaker)
 Demonice of Aetolia
 Demonicus of Pella
 Demophilus of Thespiae
 Demophon (seer)
 Demophon of Athens
 Demophon of Eleusis
 Demoptolemus
 Demosthenes
 Demosthenes (general)
 Demosthenes Philalethes
 Depictions of the sacrifice of Iphigenia
 Dercylidas
 Dereium
 Derveni Krater
 Derveni papyrus
 Descent of Perithous
 Desmon of Corinth
 Despinis Head
 Despoina
 Deucalion
 Deucalion (mythology)
 Deucalion (son of Minos)
 Deuteragonist
 Dexagoridas
 Dexamenus
 Dexippus
 Dexippus of Cos
 Dexithea (mythology)
 Dia
 Diacria
 Diacria (Euboea)
 Diades of Pella
 Diadochi
 Diadumenos
 Diaeus
 Diagoras of Melos
 Diagoras of Rhodes
 Diairesis
 Diana of Gabii
 Dianoia
 Diaphorus (mythology)
 Dias (mythology)
 Diateichisma
 Diaulos (architecture)
 Diaulos (instrument)
 Diaulos (running race)
 Dicaearchus
 Dicaearchus of Aetolia
 Dicaeus
 Dictys
 Didascaly
 Didyma
 Didymus Chalcenterus
 Didymus the Musician
 Dienekes
 Dieuches
 Digamma
 Diipetes
 Dikastes
 Dike
 Diliad
 Dimachae
 Dimoetes
 Dinarchus
 Dinocrates
 Dinon
 Dinos
 Dinos of the Gorgon Painter
 Dinos Painter
 Dinostratus
 Dio of Alexandria
 Diocles
 Diocles (mathematician)
 Diocles of Carystus
 Diocles of Cnidus
 Diocles of Corinth
 Diocles of Magnesia
 Diocles of Syracuse
 Diocorystes
 Diodorus Cronus
 Diodorus of Adramyttium
 Diodorus of Alexandria
 Diodorus of Aspendus
 Diodorus of Tyre
 Diodorus Siculus
 Diodotus (son of Eucrates)
 Diodotus the Stoic
 Dioedas
 Diogenes
 Diogenes and Alexander
 Diogenes Laërtius
 Diogenes of Apollonia
 Diogenes of Athens (sculptor)
 Diogenes of Athens (tragedian)
 Diogenes of Babylon
 Diogenes of Oenoanda
 Diogenes of Phoenicia
 Diogenes of Seleucia
 Diogenes of Tarsus
 Diogenianus
 Diolkos
 Diomea (Attica)
 Diomede
 Diomedes
 Diomedes of Thrace
 Dion
 Dion, Pieria
 Dione (mythology)
 Dione (Titaness)
 Dionysia
 Dionysiakos
 Dionysian Mysteries
 Dionysius (ambassador)
 Dionysius (Athenian commander)
 Dionysius Chalcus
 Dionysius of Byzantium
 Dionysius of Chalcedon
 Dionysius of Cyrene
 Dionysius of Halicarnassus
 Dionysius of Lamptrai
 Dionysius of Miletus
 Dionysius the Phocaean
 Dionysius the Renegade
 Dionysius Thrax
 Dionysodorus
 Dionysodorus (sophist)
 Dionysus
 Dionysus Aesymnetes
 Dionysus Cup
 Dionysus in comparative mythology
 Diopeithes
 Dioplethes
 Diores
 Dioscorides (Stoic)
 Diosphos Painter
 Diotima of Mantinea
 Diotima's Ladder of Love
 Diotimus the Stoic
 Dioxippe
 Dioxippus
 Diphilus
 Diphilus (physician)
 Diphridas
 Diphros
 Diple (textual symbol)
 Dipoenus and Scyllis
 Dipylon Amphora
 Dipylon inscription
 Dipylon krater
 Dipylon Master
 Dirce
 Disciples of Plotinus
 Discobolus
 Discophoros
 Discourses of Epictetus
 Dissoi logoi
 Distyle
 Distyle in antis
 Dithyramb
 Dium (Crete)
 Dium (Euboea)
 Dius
 Diyllus
 Dochmiac
 Dodona
 Dodona (Thessaly)
 Dodone
 Dodonian Zeus
 Dodwell Painter
 Dogmatic school
 Dokimasia
 Dokimasia Painter
 Dolichos (race)
 Doliones
 Dolius
 Dolon
 Dolops
 Dolos
 Dorian invasion
 Dorians
 Doric Greek
 Doric Hexapolis
 Doric order
 Doric Tetrapolis
 Dorieus
 Doris (Greece)
 Doris (mythology)
 Dorium
 Dorus (Deucalionid)
 Dorus (mythology)
 Dory
 Doryclus
 Doryphoros
 Doryssus
 Douris (vase painter)
 Dracanum
 Dracius
 Draco (lawgiver)
 Draco (physician)
 Draconian constitution
 Dragon's teeth (mythology)
 Dragons in Greek mythology
 Drakaina
 Dreros inscription
 Droop cup
 Drosera (naiad)
 Dryad
 Dryas (mythology)
 Dryas of Calydon
 Dryope
 Dryope (daughter of Dryops)
 Dryopes
 Dryops (mythology)
 Dryops of Oeta
 Duel Painter
 Dulichium
 Duris of Samos
 Dymas
 Dyme
 Dynamene
 Dyscrasia
 Dyskolos
 Dysnomia (deity)
 Dyssebeia

E 

 Eagle of Zeus
 Earliest Greek democracies
 Early life of Plato
 Earth (classical element)
 Earth and water
 East Greek Bird Bowl
 East Greek vase painting
 Eastern pediment of the Temple of Zeus at Olympia
 Ecbasus
 Ecclesia
 Ecdysia
 Echea
 Echecrates
 Echecrates of Phlius
 Echecrates of Thessaly
 Echecratides
 Echedemos
 Echelidae
 Echembrotus
 Echemmon
 Echemus
 Echephron
 Echestratus
 Echetlus
 Echetus
 Echidna
 Echion
 Echion (painter)
 Echius
 Echo (mythology)
 Echo Stoa
 Echthroi
 Eclectic school
 Economics (Aristotle)
 Economy of ancient Greece
 Ecphantus the Pythagorean
 Ectenes
 Ecumene
 Edinburgh Painter
 Edonis
 Education in ancient Greece
 Eetion
 Eetion (mythology)
 Ego eimi
 Eidolon
 Eidothea
 Eikas
 Eikasia
 Eileithyia
 Eilesium
 Eilissus
 Eion
 Eion (Argolis)
 Eioneus
 Eirene (artist)
 Eirene (goddess)
 Eiresidae
 Eiresione
 Eiron
 Eitea (Acamantis)
 Eitea (Antiochis)
 Ekdromoi
 Ekecheiria
 Ekklesiasterion
 Ekkyklema
 Ekphrasis
 Ekpyrosis
 Elaea (Epirus)
 Elaeus (Aetolia)
 Elaeus (Attica)
 Elaeus (Epirus)
 Elaphebolia
 Elasioi
 Elasippus
 Elateia
 Elateia (Epirus)
 Elatus
 Elbows Out
 Eleatics
 Electra
 Electra (Euripides play)
 Electra (Greek mythology)
 Electra (Oceanid)
 Electra (Pleiad)
 Electra (Sophocles play)
 Electryon
 Electryone
 Eleionomae
 Eleius
 Eleon
 Eleos
 Elephantis
 Elephenor
 Eleusinian Mysteries
 Eleusinian Mysteries Hydria
 Eleusinion
 Eleusis
 Eleusis (Boeotia)
 Eleusis (mythology)
 Eleusis Amphora
 Eleuther
 Eleutheria
 Eleutherna Bridge
 Elgin Amphora
 Elgin Marbles
 Elimiotis
 Elis (city)
 Ellopia
 Elone
 Elpenor
 Elpinice
 Elpinice (daughter of Herodes Atticus)
 Elpis
 Elymus
 Elyrus
 Elysium
 Emathion
 Empedocles
 Empiric school
 Empusa
 Enalus
 Enarephoros
 Enarete
 Enceladus (giant)
 Enchiridion of Epictetus
 Endeïs
 Endius
 Endoeus
 Endoxa
 Endymion
 Enipeus
 Enispe
 Ennomus
 Enodia
 Enope (Greece)
 Enorches
 Entochus
 Enyalius
 Enyeus
 Enyo
 Eordaea
 Eos
 Epacria
 Epactaeus
 Epaminondas
 Epaphus
 Epeigeus
 Epeius
 Epeius of Phocis
 Eperatus
 Ephebic oath
 Ephectics
 Ephesia Grammata
 Ephesian school
 Ephesus
 Ephialtes
 Ephialtes of Trachis
 Ephor
 Ephorus
 Ephyra (Aetolia)
 Ephyra (Elis)
 Epiales
 Epic Cycle
 Epicaste
 Epicephisia
 Epicharmus of Kos
 Epicleas (admiral)
 Epicles
 Epicrates of Ambracia
 Epicrates of Athens
 Epictetus
 Epicurea
 Epicureanism
 Epicurus
 Epidamnos
 Epidaurus
 Epidaurus (mythology)
 Epidaurus Limera
 Epideictic
 Epidoseis
 Epidotes
 Epieicidae
 Epigamia
 Epigenes, son of Antiphon
 Epigenes of Athens
 Epigenes of Byzantium
 Epigenes of Sicyon
 Epigeus 
 Epigoni
 Epigoni (epic)
 Epigoni (play)
 Epigonion
 Epigonus
 Epigonus of Ambracia
 Epigram of Amazaspos
 Epigrams (Homer)
 Epigrams (Plato)
 Epihipparch
 Epikleros
 Epiktetos
 Epilaus
 Epilogism
 Epimachus of Athens
 Epimeliad
 Epimenides
 Epimetheus
 Epinetron
 Epinicus
 Epinikion
 Epinomis
 Epione
 Epiphanius of Petra
 Epiphany
 Epiphron
 Epipole of Carystus
 Epirote League
 Epirus (ancient state)
 Epirus (mythology)
 Episkopoi
 Episkyros
 Epistates
 Episteme
 Epistles (Plato)
 Epistrategos
 Epistrophus
 Epitadeus
 Epitasis
 Epitelidas of Laconia
 Epithalamium
 Epithets in Homer
 Epitrepontes
 Epizelus
 Epoché
 Epochus 
 Epode
 Eponymous archon
 Epopeus
 Epopeus (king of Sicyon)
 Epsilon
 Equatorial ring
 Erasinides
 Erasinos
 Erasistratus
 Erastus of Scepsis
 Erato
 Erato (dryad)
 Erato (mythology)
 Eratosthenes (statesman)
 Erchia
 Erechtheion
 Erechtheis
 Erechtheus
 Eretria Painter
 Eretrian school
 Ereuthalion
 Ereuthus
 Erginus
 Erginus (Argonaut)
 Erginus (king of Minyans)
 Ergiscus
 Ergoteles (potter)
 Ergoteles of Himera
 Ergotimos
 Eriboea
 Eribotes
 Ericea
 Erichthonius of Athens
 Erichthonius of Dardania
 Eridanos
 Erigyius
 Erikepaios
 Erineus (city)
 Erinna
 Erinyes
 Eriopis
 Eris
 Eroeadae (Antiochis)
 Eroeadae (Hippothontis)
 Eromenos
 Eros
 Eros (concept)
 Erotes
 Erotianus
 Ersa
 Erymanthian Boar
 Erymanthus
 Erymneus
 Erysichthon of Attica
 Erysichthon of Thessaly
 Erytheia
 Erytheia (mythology)
 Erythrae (Boeotia)
 Erythrae (Locris)
 Erythraea (Crete)
 Erythraean Sibyl
 Erythras
 Eryx
 Eryxias (dialogue)
 Eryximachus
 Eta
 Eteocles
 Eteocles of Orchomenus
 Eteoclus
 Eteoneus
 Eteonicus
 Ethos
 Euaemon
 Euaeon of Lampsacus
 Eualcides
 Euboea
 Euboea (mythology)
 Euboean League
 Euboean vase painting
 Eubuleus
 Eubulides
 Eubulus (banker)
 Eubulus (poet)
 Eubulus (statesman)
 Eucharides Painter
 Eucheirus
 Euchenor
 Eucleia
 Eucleidas
 Eucleides
 Euclid
 Euclid's Elements
 Euclid's Optics
 Euclid of Megara
 Euclidean algorithm
 Euclidean geometry
 Euctemon
 Eudaemon
 Eudaimonia
 Eudamidas I
 Eudamidas II
 Eudamidas III
 Eudemian Ethics
 Eudemus
 Eudemus of Rhodes
 Eudoros
 Eudorus of Alexandria
 Eudoxus of Cnidus
 Eudoxus of Cyzicus
 Euenus
 Euergetes
 Euhemerus
 Euippe
 Euippe (daughter of Tyrimmas)
 Eukarpia
 Eulabeia (mythology)
 Eulamius
 Eumaeus
 Eumedes
 Eumelus
 Eumelus of Corinth
 Eumenes
 Eumolpidae
 Eumolpus
 Eunapius
 Euneus
 Eunicus
 Eunoia
 Eunomia
 Eunomus (admiral)
 Eunomus (king of Sparta)
 Eunostus
 Eunostus (hero)
 Eupalamus
 Eupalinos
 Eupatridae
 Eupeithes
 Euphantus
 Eupheme
 Euphemus
 Euphemus (mythology)
 Euphiletos Painter
 Euphiletos Painter Panathenaic prize amphora
 Euphorbos plate
 Euphorbus
 Euphorbus (physician)
 Euphorion
 Euphorion (playwright)
 Euphorion of Chalcis
 Euphraeus
 Euphranor
 Euphrates the Stoic
 Euphron
 Euphronios
 Euphronios Krater
 Euphrosyne
 Eupolemeia
 Eupolis
 Eupompus
 Euporia
 Eupraxia
 Eupyridae
 Eureka (word)
 Euripides
 Euripus (Acarnania)
 Euroea
 Europa (consort of Zeus)
 Europa (Greek myth)
 Europs (mythology)
 Eurotas
 Euryale (Gorgon)
 Euryalus
 Euryalus (Phaeacian)
 Euryanassa
 Eurybarus
 Eurybates
 Eurybatus
 Eurybia
 Eurybiades
 Eurybius
 Eurybotas
 Eurybus of Athens
 Eurycleia of Ithaca
 Euryclids
 Eurycrates
 Eurycratides
 Eurycyda
 Eurydamas
 Eurydice
 Eurydice (Greek myth)
 Eurydice (daughter of Adrastus)
 Eurydice of Argos
 Eurydice of Mycenae
 Eurydice of Pylos
 Eurydice of Thebes
 Euryleonis
 Eurylochus of Same
 Eurymachus
 Eurymachus (Odyssey)
 Eurymedon (mythology)
 Eurymedon (strategos)
 Eurymedon of Myrrhinus
 Eurymedon the Hierophant
 Eurymedon vase
 Eurymedousa
 Eurymenae (Epirus)
 Eurymenes
 Eurynome
 Eurynome (Oceanid)
 Eurynome of Megara
 Eurynomos (daemon)
 Eurynomus
 Euryphon
 Eurypon
 Eurypyle
 Eurypylus
 Eurypylus of Cos
 Eurypylus of Cyrene
 Eurypylus of Thessaly
 Eurypylus (son of Telephus)
 Eurysaces
 Eurysthenes
 Eurysthenes (Pergamon)
 Eurystheus
 Eurythemista
 Eurytion
 Eurytion (king of Phthia)
 Eurytios Krater
 Eurytus
 Eurytus (Pythagorean)
 Eurytus of Sparta
 Eurytus and Cteatus
 Eurytus of Oechalia
 Eusebeia
 Eusorus
 Eustathius of Cappadocia
 Euterpe
 Euthenia
 Euthydemus (dialogue)
 Euthydemus (Socratic literature)
 Euthydemus (tyrant)
 Euthydemus of Chios
 Euthydikos Kore
 Euthymenes
 Euthymia (philosophy)
 Euthymides
 Euthyna
 Euthynteria
 Euthyphro
 Euthyphro (prophet)
 Euthyphro dilemma
 Eutocius of Ascalon
 Eutrapelia
 Eutresis (Boeotia)
 Eutresis culture
 Eutychides
 Eutychius Proclus
 Euxantius
 Euxippe
 Evadne
 Evaechme
 Evagoras
 Evander (philosopher)
 Evenius
 Evenor
 Evenus
 Evenus of Aetolia
 Ever to Excel
 Everes
 Evippus
 Ex voto of the Lacaedemonians
 Exeligmos
 Exekias
 Exomis
 Expansion of Macedonia under Philip II
 Ex voto of the Arcadians
 Eye-cup

F 

 Family tree of the Greek gods
 Fiction set in ancient Greece
 Fifth-century Athens
 Fire (classical element)
 First Alcibiades
 First Ancient Theatre, Larissa
 First Battle of Lamia
 First declension
 First Macedonian War
 First Messenian War
 First Peloponnesian War
 First Persian invasion of Greece
 First Philippic
 First Sacred War
 Fish plate
 Food and diet in ancient medicine
 For Phormion
 Forced suicide
 Foreign War
 Form of the Good
 Fortunate Isles
 Foundry Painter
 Four causes
 Fourth Macedonian War
 Fourth Philippic
 Fragment from the tomb of Nikarete
 François Vase
 Free will in antiquity
 Fronto of Emesa
 Funeral games
 Funeral oration
 Funerary monument for an athlete

G 

 Gaddi Torso
 Gadfly (mythology)
 Gaia
 Galanthis
 Galatea (Greek myth)
 Galatea (mythology)
 Galaton
 Galene
 Gamelia
 Gamma
 Ganymede
 Gargareans
 Gargettus
 Garum
 Gastraphetes
 Gate of Athena Archegetis
 Gates of horn and ivory
 Gegenees
 Geison
 Gela Painter
 Gelanor
 Gello
 Gelon
 Gelon of Laconia
 Gelos
 Geminus
 Gemon
 Generation of Animals
 Genitive absolute
 Genos
 Genus (music)
 Geocentric model
 Geography of the Odyssey
 Geometric art
 Geomori (Athens)
 Geoponici
 Geraestus (Euboea)
 Gerarai
 Geras
 Gerenia
 Gerousia
 Gertus
 Geryon
 Geryoneis
 Getty kouros
 Giants
 Gigantomachy by the Suessula Painter
 Gigonus
 Gitanae
 Gla
 Glaphyrae
 Glauce
 Glaucetas
 Glaucia
 Glaucias (physician, 3rd century BC)
 Glaucias (physician, 4th century BC)
 Glaucias of Aegina
 Glaucias of Athens
 Glaucias of Macedon
 Glaucippe
 Glaucon
 Glaucus
 Glaucus (mythology)
 Glaucus of Carystus
 Glaucus of Chios
 Glaucus of Corinth
 Glaucus of Crete
 Glaucus of Lycia
 Glisas
 Glossary of Stoicism terms
 Glycon of Croton
 Gnathia vases
 Gnesippus
 Gnomic poetry
 Gnosis (artist)
 Golden Fleece
 Golden mean (philosophy)
 Golden Verses
 Golgos
 Goltyr Painter
 Gongylos
 Gonoessa
 Gordion cup
 Gordius of Cappadocia
 Gorge
 Gorgias
 Gorgias (dialogue)
 Gorgidas
 Gorgo, Queen of Sparta
 Gorgon
 Gorgon Painter
 Gorgoneion
 Gorgoneion Group
 Gorgopas (2nd century BC)
 Gorgopas (4th century BC)
 Gorgophone
 Gorgophone (Perseid)
 Gorgophonus
 Gorgus
 Gorgythion
 Gortyn
 Gortyn code
 Gortyna
 Graea
 Graeae
 Graecians
 Graecus
 Graphe paranomon
 Grave monument from Kallithea
 Grave relief of Thraseas and Euandria
 Grave stele (NAMA 7901)
 Grave Stele of Dexileos
 Grave Stele of Hegeso
 Great Rhetra
 Greco-Bactrian Kingdom
 Greco-Persian Wars
 Greco-Roman hairstyle
 Greco-Roman relations in classical antiquity
 Greece in the 5th century BC
 Greece in the Roman era
 Greek alphabet
 Greek and Roman artillery
 Greek baths
 Greek Baths in ancient Olympia
 Greek baths of Gela
 Greek chorus
 Greek city-state patron gods
 Greek colonisation
 Greek chorus
 Greek Dark Ages
 Greek democracy
 Greek diacritics
 Greek divination
 Greek drachma
 Greek gardens
 Greek hero cult
 Greek Heroic Age
 Greek inscriptions
 Greek letters used in mathematics, science, and engineering
 Greek love
 Greek lyric
 Greek mathematics
 Greek mythology
 Greek mythology in popular culture
 Greek mythology in western art and literature
 Greek numerals
 Greek orthography
 Greek primordial deities
 Greek riddles
 Greek sea gods
 Greek terracotta figurines
 Greek Theatre of Syracuse
 Greek tragedy
 Greek underworld
 Greek words for love
 Greek wrestling
 Greeks in pre-Roman Gaul
 Griffin Warrior Tomb
 Group E (vase painting)
 Group of Rhodes 12264
 Gryllus, son of Xenophon
 Gryton
 Guneus
 Gutta
 Gylippus
 Gylis
 Gylon
 Gymnasiarch
 Gymnasium
 Gymnasium at Delphi
 Gymnitae
 Gymnopaedia
 Gynaeconomi
 Gynaecothoenas
 Gyrton (Thessaly)

H 

 Hades
 Hadra vase
 Hadrian's Library
 Haemon
 Haemon (mythology)
 Haemus
 Hagius
 Hagnias
 Hagnon of Tarsus
 Hagnon, son of Nikias
 Haimon Painter
 Halae Aexonides
 Halae Araphenides
 Halaesus
 Halasarna
 Halcyon (dialogue)
 Haliacmon (mythology)
 Haliartus
 Halie
 Halirrhothius
 Halitherses
 Halizones
 Haloa
 Halteres
 Hamadryad
 Hamartia
 Hamaxantia
 Harma (Attica)
 Harma (Boeotia)
 Harmodius and Aristogeiton
 Harmodius and Aristogeiton (sculpture)
 Harmonia
 Harmost
 Harpalion
 Harpalus
 Harpalus (astronomer)
 Harpalus (engineer)
 Harpalus (son of Polemaeus)
 Harpalyce
 Harpalykos
 Harpe
 Harpina
 Harpina (city)
 Harpleia
 Harpocration
 Harpy
 Harpy Tomb
 Harrow Painter
 Hasselmann Painter
 Head of a Philosopher
 Hebe (mythology)
 Hecale (Attica)
 Hecale (poem)
 Hecamede
 Hecataeus of Miletus
 Hecate
 Hecaterus
 Hecato of Rhodes
 Hecatomb
 Hecatompedum
 Hecatoncheires
 Hector
 Hecuba
 Hecuba (play)
 Hedea of Tralles
 Hedone
 Hedylogos
 Hegemon of Thasos
 Hegemone
 Hegesandridas
 Hegesias of Cyrene
 Hegesias of Sinope
 Hegesinus of Pergamon
 Hegesippus (orator)
 Hegesippus of Halicarnassus
 Hegesistratus
 Hegetoria
 Hegetorides
 Hegias
 Hegias of Athens
 Heidelberg Painter
 Heimarmene
 Hekatompedon temple
 Helen of Troy
 Helenus
 Helepolis
 Heleus
 Heliadae
 Heliades
 Heliaia
 Heliastic oath
 Helicaon
 Helice (mythology)
 Helike
 Halimus
 Heliocentrism
 Heliodorus (ambassador)
 Heliodorus (metrist)
 Heliodorus (surgeon)
 Heliodorus of Athens
 Heliodorus of Emesa
 Heliodorus of Larissa
 Helios
 Helladic chronology
 Hellanicus (mythology)
 Hellanicus of Lesbos
 Hellanodikai
 Hellas
 Helle
 Hellen
 Hellenic historiography
 Hellenica
 Hellenistic armies
 Hellenistic art
 Hellenistic glass
 Hellenistic Greece
 Hellenistic influence on Indian art
 Hellenistic period
 Hellenistic philosophy
 Hellenistic portraiture
 Hellenistic Prince
 Hellenistic religion
 Hellenistic theatre of Dion
 Hellenization
 Hellenotamiae
 Hellespontine Sibyl
 Hellespontophylakes
 Hellotia
 Helmetheus
 Helos
 Helos (Elis)
 Helots
 Hemera
 Hemithea (mythology)
 Hemithorakion
 Henioche
 Hepatizon
 Hephaestia
 Hephaestio
 Hephaestion (grammarian)
 Hephaestus
 Hera
 Hera Alexandros
 Hera Ammonia
 Heraclea (Acarnania)
 Heraclea in Trachis
 Heraclean Tablets
 Heracleia (festival)
 Heracleidae
 Heracleides (409 BC)
 Heracleides (415 BC)
 Heracleides (admiral)
 Heracleides (ambassador)
 Heracleides of Byzantium
 Heracleides of Cyme
 Heracleides of Ephesus
 Heracleides of Gyrton
 Heracleides of Maroneia
 Heracleides of Mylasa
 Heracleides of Tarentum
 Heracleides the Phocian
 Heracles
 Heracles Papyrus
 Heracles Patroos
 Heraclides (painter)
 Heraclides (physician)
 Heraclides of Aenus
 Heraclides of Erythrae
 Heraclides of Smyrna
 Heraclides of Tarentum
 Heraclides of Tarsus
 Heraclides Ponticus
 Heraclitus
 Heraclitus (commentator)
 Heraclitus the Paradoxographer
 Heraclius the Cynic
 Heraea (Arcadia)
 Heraean Games
 Heraeum (Thrace)
 Heraion of Argos
 Heraion of Perachora
 Heraion of Samos
 Heraklas
 Herakles (Euripides)
 Herald and Trumpet contest
 Hercules and the lion of Nemea (Louvre Museum, L 31 MN B909)
 Hercules and the Wagoner
 Hercules at the crossroads
 Herillus
 Herm (sculpture)
 Hermaea
 Hermagoras of Amphipolis
 Hermaphroditus
 Hermarchus
 Hermeneumata
 Hermes
 Hermes and the Infant Dionysus
 Hermes Logios type
 Hermes Ludovisi
 Hermes Trismegistus
 Hermias of Atarneus
 Hermione
 Hermione (Argolis)
 Hermippe
 Hermippus
 Hermippus of Berytus
 Hermippus of Smyrna
 Hermocrates
 Hermocrates (dialogue)
 Hermodike I
 Hermodike II
 Hermodorus
 Hermodorus of Salamis
 Hermogenes (philosopher)
 Hermogenes (potter)
 Hermogenes of Priene
 Hermonax
 Hermotimus of Clazomenae
 Hermotimus of Pedasa
 Hermus
 Hermus (Attica)
 Hero
 Hero and Leander
 Herodicus
 Herodorus
 Herodorus of Megara
 Herodotus
 Herodotus (physician)
 Heroic nudity
 Heroön
 Heroon at Nemea
 Herophilos
 Herophon
 Herostratus
 Herpyllis
 Herse
 Herse of Athens
 Hesiod
 Hesione
 Hesione (mythology)
 Hesione (Oceanid)
 Hesperia
 Hesperides
 Hesperis
 Hesperus
 Hessus (Locris)
 Hestia
 Hestiaea (Attica)
 Hestiaeus of Perinthus
 Hesychius of Alexandria
 Hetaira
 Hicesius
 Hicetaon
 Hicetas
 Hicetas of Leontini
 Hiera Orgas
 Hierapytna
 Hierax (Spartan admiral)
 Hiereiai
 Hiero (Xenophon)
 Hierocles (Stoic)
 Hieromenia
 Hieromneme
 Hieronymus of Cardia
 Hieronymus of Rhodes
 Hierophant
 Hierophylakes
 Hieropoios
 Hieros gamos
 High Priestess of Athena Polias
 Hilaeira
 Himation
 Himeraeus
 Hippalcimus
 Hippalectryon
 Hippalus
 Hipparchia of Maroneia
 Hipparchic cycle
 Hipparchicus
 Hipparchus
 Hipparchus (brother of Hippias)
 Hipparchus (cavalry officer)
 Hipparchus (dialogue)
 Hippasus
 Hippasus (mythology)
 Hippe
 Hippeis
 Hippias
 Hippias (tyrant)
 Hippias Major
 Hippias Minor
 Hippo (philosopher)
 Hippobotus
 Hippocampus
 Hippocleides
 Hippocoon
 Hippocoon of Sparta
 Hippocrates
 Hippocrates, father of Peisistratos
 Hippocrates (physicians)
 Hippocrates of Athens
 Hippocrates of Chios
 Hippocrates of Gela
 Hippocratic bench
 Hippocratic Corpus
 Hippocratic Oath
 Hippocrene
 Hippodamas
 Hippodamia (mythology)
 Hippodamia (daughter of Oenomaus)
 Hippodamia (wife of Autonous)
 Hippodamia (wife of Pirithous)
 Hippodamus of Miletus
 Hippodrome
 Hippodrome of Olympia
 Hippolochus (mythology)
 Hippolochus of Troy
 Hippolyta
 Hippolyte
 Hippolytus (Greek myth)
 Hippolytus (play)
 Hippolytus (son of Theseus)
 Hippomedon
 Hippomedon of Sparta
 Hippomedon (Seven against Thebes)
 Hippomenes
 Hipponax
 Hipponicus III
 Hipponous
 Hippotae
 Hippotes
 Hippothoe
 Hippothoon
 Hippothous
 Hippotion
 Hippotomadae
 Histiaeotis
 Histiaeus
 Historia Plantarum (Theophrastus book)
 Historicity of the Homeric epics
 Histories (Herodotus)
 History of Animals
 History of Athens
 History of Crete
 History of ethics in Ancient Greece
 History of Greece
 History of Greek and Hellenistic Sicily
 History of Macedonia (ancient kingdom)
 History of medicine in Cyprus
 History of Sparta
 History of the Peloponnesian War
 Hodoedocus
 Homados
 Homer
 Homer's Ithaca
 Homeric Greek
 Homeric Hymns
 Homeric prayer
 Homeridae
 Homerus of Byzantium
 Homonoia
 Homonoia (mythology)
 Homosexuality in ancient Greece
 Homosexuality in the militaries of ancient Greece
 Hopleus
 Hoplite
 Hoplite formation in art
 Hoplite phalanx
 Hoplitodromos
 Horae
 Horkos
 Horme
 Horsehead Amphora
 Horses Amphora
 Horus (athlete)
 Hubris
 Humorism
 Hyacinth
 Hyacinthia
 Hyacinthus the Lacedaemonian
 Hyades
 Hyagnis
 Hyampolis
 Hyamus
 Hyas
 Hybadae
 Hybrias
 Hybris
 Hybristica
 Hydaspes (mythology)
 Hydna
 Hydraulic telegraph
 Hydraulis
 Hydraulis of Dion
 Hydria
 Hydria (Paros)
 Hyettus
 Hyettus (Boeotia)
 Hygieia
 Hylates
 Hyle
 Hyle (Boeotia)
 Hyle (Locris)
 Hyllus
 Hyllus (mythology)
 Hylomorphism
 Hymnus
 Hypaethral
 Hypate
 Hypenus of Elis
 Hyperanthes
 Hyperasius
 Hyperbatas
 Hyperbius
 Hyperbolus
 Hyperborea
 Hypereides
 Hypereides (potter)
 Hyperenor
 Hyperes
 Hyperetes
 Hyperion
 Hyperippe
 Hypermnestra
 Hypermnestra (mythology)
 Hypermnestra of Aetolia
 Hyperochus
 Hyperphas
 Hyperuranion
 Hypnos
 Hypobibazon Class
 Hypodiastole
 Hypokeimenon
 Hyporchema
 Hypothesis (drama)
 Hypotrachelium
 Hypsenor
 Hypseus
 Hypsicerus
 Hypsicles
 Hypsipyle
 Hypsipyle (play)
 Hyria (Boeotia)
 Hyrieus
 Hyrmine
 Hyrmine (Elis)
 Hyrtacina
 Hyrtacus
 Hysiae (Argolis)
 Hysiae (Boeotia)
 Hysminai
 Hysmon
 Hysplex

I 

 I know that I know nothing
 Iacchus
 Ialemus
 Ialmenus
 Ialysos (mythology)
 Ialysus
 Iambe
 Iamenus
 Iamidai
 Iamus
 Ianeira
 Iapetus
 Iapyx
 Iardanus
 Iardanus of Lydia
 Iasion
 Iaso
 Iasus
 Iasus (king of Argos)
 Iatromantis
 Ibycus
 Icaria (Attica)
 Icarius
 Icarius (Athenian)
 Icarius (Spartan)
 Icarius of Hyperesia
 Icarus
 Iccus of Taranto
 Ichnaea
 Ichneutae
 Ichor
 Ichthyas
 Ichthyocentaurs
 Ictinus
 Ida
 Ida (mother of Minos)
 Ida (nurse of Zeus)
 Idaea
 Idaean Dactyls
 Idalion Tablet
 Idas
 Idas (mythology)
 Idmon
 Idmon (Argonaut)
 Idomeneus of Crete
 Idomeneus of Lampsacus
 Idrias
 Idyia
 Idyma
 Iliad
 Ilione
 Ilioneus
 Ilioupersis Painter
 Ilium (Epirus)
 Iliupersis
 Illyrian type helmet
 Illyrian weaponry
 Illyrius
 Ilus
 Ilus (son of Dardanus)
 Ilus (son of Tros)
 Imagines (work by Philostratus)
 Imbrex and tegula
 Imbrius
 Imbrus
 Immaradus
 Impluvium
 Inachorium
 Inachus
 Inatus
 Incomposite interval
 Indica (Arrian)
 Indica (Ctesias)
 Indo-Greek Kingdom
 Infinitive
 Ino
 Interpretation of Dreams (Antiphon)
 Invasions of Epidamnus
 Io
 Iobates
 Iodame
 Ioke
 Iolaidas of Argos
 Iolaus
 Iolcus
 Iole
 Ion
 Ion (dialogue)
 Ion (play)
 Ion of Chios
 Ionian League
 Ionian Revolt
 Ionian School (philosophy)
 Ionians
 Ionic Greek
 Ionic order
 Ionic vase painting
 Ionidae
 Ionides
 Iophon
 Iota
 Iota subscript
 Iphianassa
 Iphianassa (daughter of Agamemnon)
 Iphianeira
 Iphicles
 Iphiclus
 Iphicrates
 Iphidamas
 Iphigenia
 Iphigenia in Aulis
 Iphigenia in Tauris
 Iphimedeia
 Iphinoe
 Iphis
 Iphis (mythology)
 Iphistiadae
 Iphito
 Iphitos
 Iphitus of Oechalia
 Iphthime
 Ipnus
 Ipotane
 Ira (Messenia)
 Iris
 Iron Age Greek migrations
 Irus
 Isaeus
 Isagoras
 Ischys
 Isindus
 Ismarus (Thrace)
 Ismene
 Ismene (Asopid)
 Ismenias
 Ismenis
 Ismenus
 Isocrates
 Isonoe
 Isopoliteia
 Istasus
 Isthmia (ancient city)
 Isthmian Games
 Istron
 Istrus (mythology)
 Isus
 Isus (Boeotia)
 Isus (Megaris)
 Isyllus
 Italian School (philosophy)
 Italus
 Ithaca
 Ithaca (polis)
 Ithome
 Ithome (Thessaly)
 Ithoria
 Iton (Thessaly)
 Itonia
 Itonus
 Itylus
 Ixion
 Iynx

J 

 Jar (pelike) with Odysseus and Elpenor
 Jason
 Jason of Nysa
 Jena Painter
 Jocasta
 Jockey of Artemision
 Judgement of Paris
 Judgement of Paris Amphora
 Julianus the Egyptian

K 

 Kabiria Group
 Kachrylion
 Kai
 Kairos
 Kakia
 Kakodaimonistai
 Kalamos
 Kale
 Kalos inscription
 Kalos kagathos
 Kamares ware
 Kamira
 Kanathos
 Kandaulos
 Kanephoros
 Kantharos
 Kapheleis
 Kappa
 Karamuza
 Karbasyanda
 Kardaki Temple
 Karpion
 Karpos
 Kasolaba
 Kassel cup
 Kasta Tomb
 Katabasis
 Katakekaumene
 Katalepsis
 Kathekon
 Katolophyromai
 Kaunos
 Kausia
 Kerameikos
 Kerameikos steles
 Kerch style
 Keres
 Kernos
 Kerykes
 Kestros (weapon)
 Khalkotauroi
 Kheriga
 Khôra
 Kiln
 King Teucer
 Kladeos
 Klazomenai
 Klazomenian sarcophagi
 Klazomenian vase painting
 Kleino (musician)
 Kleitias
 Kleitomachos (athlete)
 Kleobis and Biton
 Kleophon Painter
 Kleophrades Painter
 Kleophrades Painter Panathenaic prize amphora
 Kleos
 Kleroterion
 Klismos
 Knossos
 Know thyself
 Koalemos
 Kobalos
 Kodapeis
 Koine Greek
 Koine Greek grammar
 Koinon
 Koinon of Macedonians
 Kolakretai
 Koliorga
 Kolonai
 Kolonos Hill
 Kolpos
 Komast cup
 Kommos (theatre)
 Komos
 Konos
 Kopis
 Kora of Sicyon
 Korai of Ionia
 Korai of the Acropolis of Athens
 Kore (sculpture)
 Kore of Lyons
 Korkyra (mythology)
 Korkyra (polis)
 Korophaioi
 Korybantes
 Kottabos
 Kotthybos
 Kouloura
 Kourion
 Kouroi of Flerio
 Kouros
 Kouros of Apollonas
 Kouros of Samos
 Kouros of Tenea
 Kourotrophos
 Krater
 Kratos
 Kresilas
 Kriophoros
 Kritios
 Kritios Boy
 Krocylea
 Kroisos Kouros
 Krokinas of Larissa
 Kronia
 Krotos
 KX Painter
 KY Painter
 Kyathos
 Kybernis
 Kydoimos
 Kydonia
 Kykeon
 Kyklos
 Kylix
 Kylix depicting athletic combats by Onesimos
 Kylix depicting Pentathletes
 Kymopoleia
 Kynodesme
 Kyrbas
 Kyrbissos
 Kyrenia ship
 Kyrios

L 

 Labda
 Labdacus
 Labotas
 Lacedaemon
 Lacedaemonius
 Lachares
 Laches (dialogue)
 Laches (general)
 Lachesis
 Laciadae
 Laconian vase painting
 Laconic phrase
 Laconicus
 Laconophilia
 Lacritus
 Lacydes of Cyrene
 Ladon (mythology)
 Ladromus of Laconia
 Laelaps
 Laertes 
 Laestrygon
 Laestrygonians
 Lagoras
 Laïs (physician)
 Laius
 Lakaina
 Lamachus
 Lamas (mythology)
 Lambda
 Lamedon (mythology)
 Lamian War
 Lamis
 Lamiskos
 Lamon (Crete)
 Lampad
 Lampadephoria
 Lampetia
 Lamponeia
 Lamprocles
 Lamprus
 Lamprus of Erythrae
 Lamptrai
 Lampus
 Land reform in Athens
 Land reform in Sparta
 Laocoön
 Laocoon (mythology)
 Laodamas
 Laodamia
 Laodamia of Phylace
 Laodice
 Laodice (daughter of Priam)
 Laodicea (Arcadia)
 Laodocus
 Laomedon
 Laomedon of Mytilene
 Laonome
 Laophonte
 Laophoon
 Laothoe
 Laphria
 Lapithaeum
 Lapithes (hero)
 Lapiths
 Larnax
 Las (Greece)
 Lasaea
 Lasion
 Lasthenes
 Lasus of Hermione
 Late Greek
 Latmus (town)
 Law court (ancient Athens)
 Law of abode
 Laws (dialogue)
 Leaena
 Leagros Group
 League of Corinth
 League of Free Laconians
 League of the Islanders
 League of the Macedonians
 Learchus
 Lebedus
 Lebes
 Lebes Gamikos
 Lechaeum
 Leda
 Ledon
 Ledra
 Lefkandi
 Leimone
 Leiocritus
 Leitus
 Lekhes
 Lekythos
 Lelantine War
 Lelantos
 Lelex
 Lelex (mythology)
 Lelex of Laconia
 Lelex of Megara
 Lemnian Athena
 Lemnos
 Lenaia
 Lenobius
 Lenormant Athena
 Lenos (Elis)
 Leo (mythology)
 Leo of Phlius
 Leochares
 Leocrates
 Leodamas of Thasos
 Leodes
 Leon (mathematician)
 Leon of Salamis
 Leon of Sparta
 Leonidaion
 Leonidas I
 Leonidas II
 Leonidas (physician)
 Leonidas (sculpture)
 Leonidas of Rhodes
 Leonteus
 Leonteus of Lampsacus
 Leontiades
 Leontiades (Thermopylae)
 Leontichus
 Leontion
 Leontis
 Leophron
 Leos (mythology)
 Leosthenes
 Leosthenes (admiral)
 Leotychidas
 Lepreum
 Lepreus
 Lepsia
 Lepsimandus
 Leptines of Syracuse
 Lerna
 Lernaean Hydra
 Lesbonax
 Lesbos
 Lesche
 Lesche of the Knidians
 Lesches
 Lethe
 Leto
 Leucadius
 Leuce
 Leucippe
 Leucippus
 Leucippus (mythology)
 Leucippus of Crete
 Leucippus of Messenia
 Leucippus of Sicyon
 Leucon
 Leuconoe (Attica)
 Leucopeus
 Leucothea
 Leucothoe (daughter of Orchamus)
 Leucothoe (mythology)
 Leucus
 Leukaspides
 Libanius
 Libon
 Libya
 Libyan Sibyl
 Lichas
 Lichas (Spartan)
 Licymnius
 Life of Homer (Pseudo-Herodotus)
 Lilaea
 Lilaea (ancient city)
 Lilaeus (mythology)
 Limenius
 Limnad
 Limnae (Peloponnesus)
 Limnae (Sparta)
 Limnaea (Acarnania)
 Limnaeus
 Limnio
 Limos
 Lindos Chronicle
 Lindus (mythology)
 Linear A
 Linear B
 Linothorax
 Linus (Argive)
 Linus (mythology)
 Linus of Thrace
 Lion Gate
 Lion of Amphipolis
 Lion of Cithaeron
 Lion Painter
 Lip Cup
 Lipara (mythology)
 Liriope
 Litae
 Literary topos
 Lithobolos
 Litra
 Little Iliad
 Little-Master cup
 Little Masters
 Liturgy
 Lityerses
 Lochagos
 Lochos
 Locrian Greek
 Locrians
 Locris
 Locrus
 Logographer (legal)
 Logographer (history)
 Logos
 Long Wall (Thracian Chersonese)
 Long Walls
 Longus
 Lopadotemachoselachogaleokranioleipsanodrimhypotrimmatosilphiokarabomelitokatakec hymenokichlepikossyphophattoperisteralektryonoptekephalliokigklopeleiolagoiosiraiobap hetraganopterygon
 Lophis
 Lotus-eaters
 Lotus tree
 Loutrophoros
 Lower Ancyle
 Lower Paeania
 Lower Pergase
 Lower Potamus
 Lucanian vase painting
 Lucian
 Ludovisi Throne
 Lupercus of Berytus
 Lusia (Attica)
 Lycaethus
 Lycaon
 Lycaon (king of Arcadia)
 Lycaon (son of Priam)
 Lycaste
 Lycastus
 Lycastus (Crete)
 Lyceum
 Lyceus
 Lyciscus of Messenia
 Lycius (sculptor)
 Lyco of Iasos
 Lyco of Troas
 Lycomedes
 Lycomedes (mythology)
 Lycomedes of Mantinea
 Lycomedes of Thebes
 Lycophron
 Lycophron (mythology)
 Lycophron (sophist)
 Lycophron of Corinth
 Lycoreia
 Lycorus
 Lyctus
 Lycurgeia
 Lycurgus
 Lycurgus (king of Sparta)
 Lycurgus of Arcadia
 Lycurgus of Athens
 Lycurgus (of Nemea)
 Lycurgus of Sparta
 Lycurgus of Thrace
 Lycus
 Lycus (Thebes)
 Lycus of Euboea
 Lycus of Fortunate Isles
 Lycus of Libya
 Lydiadas of Megalopolis
 Lydion
 Lydos
 Lydus
 Lygdamis of Naxos
 Lykaia
 Lynceus
 Lynceus of Argos
 Lynceus of Messenia
 Lynceus of Samos
 Lyncus
 Lyrceia
 Lyrcus
 Lyrcus (son of Abas)
 Lyre
 Lyrnessus
 Lysander
 Lysianassa
 Lysias
 Lysicles (4th century BC)
 Lysicles (5th century BC)
 Lysidice
 Lysimache
 Lysimachia (Aetolia)
 Lysimachus
 Lysinomus
 Lysippe
 Lysippides Painter
 Lysippos
 Lysis (dialogue)
 Lysis of Taras
 Lysistrata
 Lysistratus
 Lysithea (mythology)
 Lysithous
 Lyssa
 Lysus
 Lyttian War

M 

 Macar
 Macareus (son of Aeolus)
 Macareus of Rhodes
 Macaria
 Macedonia
 Macedonian phalanx
 Macelo (mythology)
 Machai
 Machanidas
 Machaon
 Machatas (sculptor)
 Machatas of Aetolia
 Machatas of Europos
 Macistus
 Macmillan aryballos
 Madrid Painter
 Maeandropolis
 Maenad
 Maenalus
 Maeon
 Maera (hound)
 Magic in the Greco-Roman world
 Magna Graecia
 Magna Moralia
 Magnes (mythology)
 Magnes (comic poet)
 Magnes (son of Aeolus)
 Magnes (son of Argos)
 Magnetes
 Maia
 Makedon
 Makhaira
 Makra Stoa
 Makron
 Malians
 Mamercus of Catane
 Mamertines
 Mandrocleides
 Mandrocles
 Manes of Lydia
 Maniae
 Manika
 Mannerists (Greek vase painting)
 Mantias
 Mantineia
 Mantineia Base
 Mantius
 Manto
 Manto (daughter of Tiresias)
 Manumission inscriptions at Delphi
 Marathon
 Marathon (mythology)
 Marathon Boy
 Marathon tumuli
 Mardonius (general)
 Mares of Diomedes
 Margites
 Margos
 Mariandynus
 Marianus Scholasticus
 Marinus of Neapolis
 Marion, Cyprus
 Maron
 Maroneia (Attica)
 Marpessa
 Marpessa of Aetolia
 Marpsius
 Marriage in ancient Greece
 Marsyas
 Marsyas Painter
 Marvels (Theopompus)
 Maschalismos
 Mases
 Mask of Agamemnon 
 Mastos
 Mastos Painter
 Material monism
 Mathematical text fragment (Berlin, Staatliche Museen, pap. 11529)
 Matton
 Maximus of Tyre
 Meander
 Measurement of a Circle
 Mechane
 Mechanics (Aristotle)
 Mecisteus
 Mecon (mythology)
 Meda
 Medea
 Medea (play)
 Medeon (Acarnania)
 Medeon (Boeotia)
 Medesicaste
 Medici Vase
 Medimnos
 Medism
 Medius (physician)
 Medius of Larissa
 Medon (mythology)
 Medus
 Medusa
 Megacles
 Megacles of Epirus
 Megaera
 Megala Erga
 Megalai Ehoiai
 Megalopolis
 Megalostrata (poet)
 Megapenthes
 Megapenthes (son of Menelaus)
 Megapenthes (son of Proetus)
 Megara
 Megareus of Onchestus
 Megareus of Thebes
 Megarian decree
 Megarian school
 Megarian Treasury (Delphi)
 Megarian Treasury (Olympia)
 Megaris
 Megaron
 Megasthenes
 Meges
 Meges of Sidon
 Megistias
 Meidias
 Meidias Painter
 Meilichios
 Melaenae
 Melaina
 Melampodia
 Melampus
 Melaneus (mythology)
 Melaneus of Oechalia
 Melanippe
 Melanippe (daughter of Aeolus)
 Melanippides
 Melanippus
 Melanthius
 Melanthius (Odyssey)
 Melantho
 Melanthus
 Melas
 Meleager
 Meleager of Gadara
 Meleager of Skopas
 Meleager Painter
 Melera
 Melete
 Meletus
 Melia (consort of Apollo)
 Melia (consort of Inachus)
 Meliae
 Melian pithamphora
 Melian relief
 Meliboea
 Melicertes
 Melinoë
 Melisseus
 Melissus of Samos
 Melite (Attica)
 Melite (heroine)
 Melite (mythology)
 Melite (naiad)
 Melpeia
 Melpomene
 Members of the Delian League
 Memnon of Rhodes
 Memorabilia (Xenophon)
 Memphis
 Memphis (daughter of Epaphus)
 Menaechmus
 Menander
 Menander of Ephesus
 Mene
 Menecrates (sculptor)
 Menecrates of Syracuse
 Menecrates of Tralles
 Menedemus
 Menedemus of Pyrrha
 Menedemus the Cynic
 Menelaion
 Menelaus
 Menelaus (son of Lagus)
 Menelaus of Alexandria
 Menelaus of Pelagonia
 Menemachus
 Menemachus (mythology)
 Menesaechmus
 Menesthes
 Menestheus
 Menesthius
 Menexenus
 Menexenus (dialogue)
 Menippe
 Menippe and Metioche
 Menippean satire
 Menippus
 Menippus (mythology)
 Meniskos
 Meno
 Meno (general)
 Meno's slave
 Menodotus of Nicomedia
 Menoeceus
 Menoetius
 Menon
 Menon I of Pharsalus
 Mental illness in ancient Greece
 Mentes (King of the Cicones)
 Mentes (King of the Taphians)
 Metonic cycle
 Mentor (Greek myth)
 Mentor (Odyssey)
 Mentor of Rhodes
 Meridarch
 Meriones
 Mermerus
 Mermerus and Pheres
 Merope (Greek myth)
 Merope (daughter of Oenopion)
 Merope (Messenia)
 Merope (Oedipus)
 Merope (Pleiad)
 Meropis
 Merops
 Merrythought cup
 Mesangylon
 Mesaulius
 Mese
 Mesoa
 Mesogeia
 Mesogeia Painter
 Messa (Greece)
 Messapian pottery
 Messene
 Messenia (ancient region)
 Mesthles
 Mestor
 Metabasis paradox
 Metageitnia
 Metagenes
 Metakosmia
 Metamorphoses in Greek mythology
 Metanira
 Metapa
 Metaphysics (Aristotle)
 Metaxy
 Metempsychosis
 Methe
 Methodic school
 Methon
 Metic
 Metion
 Meton of Athens
 Metope
 Metope (mythology)
 Metopes of the Parthenon
 Metretes
 Metrocles
 Metrodora
 Metrodorus (grammarian)
 Metrodorus of Athens
 Metrodorus of Chios
 Metrodorus of Cos
 Metrodorus of Lampsacus (the elder)
 Metrodorus of Lampsacus (the younger)
 Metrodorus of Scepsis
 Metrodorus of Stratonicea
 Metrological Relief
 Metron of Pydna
 Metroon
 Metropolis (Doris)
 Metropolis (Euboea)
 Metropolis (Perrhaebia)
 Metropolis (Thessaly)
 Miasma (Greek mythology)
 Micon
 Micythus
 Middle Gate (Piraeus)
 Middle Platonism
 Mideia
 Midnight poem
 Milesian school
 Milesian tale
 Miletus
 Miletus (mythology)
 Military Decree of Amphipolis
 Military of Mycenaean Greece
 Military tactics in Ancient Greece
 Milo of Croton
 Miltiades
 Miltiades the Elder
 Mimas (Aeneid)
 Mimas (Giant)
 Mimnermus
 Mindarus
 Mines of Laurion
 Minoa
 Minos
 Minos (dialogue)
 Minotaur
 Minthe
 Minyades
 Minyans
 Minyas
 Minyas (poem)
 Misenus
 Misthophoria
 Mithaecus
 Mixing bowl with the exposure of baby Aegisthos
 Mixobarbaroi
 Mixolydian mode
 Mnasagoras
 Mnasippus
 Mnasitheus of Sicyon
 Mnason of Phocis
 Mneme
 Mnemosyne
 Mnesarchus of Athens
 Mnesikles
 Mnesitheus
 Modern understanding of Greek mythology
 Moerocles
 Molon labe
 Molossians
 Molpadia
 Molurus
 Molus (mythology)
 Molus (Argive soldier)
 Molus of Aetolia
 Molus of Crete
 Moly (herb)
 Momus
 Monimus
 Monument of Prusias II
 Monument of the Eponymous Heroes
 Mopsus
 Mopsus (Argonaut)
 Mopsus (son of Manto)
 Mora
 Moral intellectualism
 Moria
 Moros
 Morpheus
 Mosaics of Delos
 Moschion (physician)
 Moschion (tragic poet)
 Moschophoros
 Mothax
 Motya Charioteer
 Mount Helicon
 Mount Ida
 Mount Kyllini
 Mount Lykaion
 Mount Oeta
 Mount Olympus
 Mount Parthenion
 Mount Pentelicus
 Mourning Athena
 Movable nu
 Mu (letter)
 Munich Kouros
 Munichia
 Munichia (festival)
 Munichus
 Musaeus of Athens
 Muscle cuirass
 Muses
 Museum of Ancient Greek Technology
 Music of ancient Greece
 Musical system of ancient Greece
 Mycenae
 Mycenae (Crete)
 Mycenaean figurine on tripod
 Mycenaean Greece
 Mycenaean Greek
 Mycenaean palace amphora with octopus (NAMA 6725)
 Mycenaean pottery
 Mycenaean religion
 Mycene
 Mydon
 Mygdon of Bebryces
 Mygdon of Phrygia
 Mygdon of Thrace
 Mygdonia
 Myia
 Myia
 Myiagros
 Mykonos
 Mykonos vase
 Myles
 Myma
 Mynes (mythology)
 Myra
 Myrmekes
 Myrmex
 Myrmidon (hero)
 Myrmidon of Athens
 Myrmidone
 Myrmidons
 Myron
 Myron of Priene
 Myrrhinus
 Myrrhinutta
 Myrtilus
 Myrtis
 Myrtis of Anthedon
 Myrto
 Myrto (mythology)
 Myscellus
 Mysius
 Myson of Chenae
 Mysus
 Myth of Er
 Mythos (Aristotle)
 Mytilene
 Mytilenean Debate
 Mytilenean revolt

N 

 N Painter
 Nabis
 Naiad
 Naiskos
 Name vase
 Names of the Greeks
 Nana
 Napaeae
 Napaeus (mythology)
 Narcissus
 Narycus
 Natural slavery
 Naubolus
 Naucrary
 Naucratis Painter
 Nauplius
 Nausicaa
 Nausinous
 Nausiphanes
 Nausithous
 Navarch
 Naxia (Caria)
 Naxos (Crete)
 Naxos (mythology)
 Neaera
 Neaira
 Nealkes
 Neandreia
 Neanthes of Cyzicus
 Neapolis (Chalcidice)
 Neapolis (Thrace)
 Neapolis (Thracian Chersonese)
 Nearchos
 Nearchus of Elea
 Nearchus of Orchomenus
 Nebris
 Neck Amphora by Exekias (Berlin F 1720)
 Necklace of Harmonia
 Necromanteion of Acheron
 Neikea
 Nekyia
 Neleides
 Neleus
 Neleus of Scepsis
 Nemean Baths
 Nemean Games
 Nemean lion
 Nemesis
 Nemesis (philosophy)
 Neo-Attic
 Neobule
 Neodamodes
 Neon
 Neon (Phocis)
 Neoplatonism
 Neoptolemus
 Neopythagoreanism
 Neorion
 Neorion at Samothrace
 Nepenthe
 Nephalia
 Nephalion
 Nephele
 Nericus
 Neris (Cynuria)
 Nerites
 Neritum
 Nesoi
 Nessos of Chios
 Nessos Painter
 Nessus
 Nestor
 Nestor's Cup (Mycenae)
 Nestor's Cup (mythology)
 Nestor's Cup (Pithekoussai)
 Nestor of Tarsus
 Nete
 New York Kouros
 Nicaea
 Nicaea (Locris)
 Nicander
 Nicander of Sparta
 Nicanor of Cyrene
 Nicanor Stigmatias
 Nicarchus
 Nicarchus (general)
 Nicarete of Megara
 Nichomachus
 Nicias
 Nicias of Nicaea
 Nicippe
 Nicobule
 Nicochares
 Nicocles (Paphos)
 Nicocles (Salamis)
 Nicocles of Sicyon
 Nicodamus (sculptor)
 Nicodorus of Mantineia
 Nicomachus
 Nicomachus (father of Aristotle)
 Nicomachus (son of Aristotle)
 Nicomachus of Thebes
 Nicomedes (mathematician)
 Nicomedes of Sparta
 Nicophon
 Nicopolis
 Nicostratus
 Nicostratus (comic poet)
 Nicoteles of Cyrene
 Nike
 Nike of Callimachus
 Nike of Paros
 Nikosthenes
 Nikosthenic amphora
 Nikoxenos Painter
 Nilus (mythology)
 Nine Lyric Poets
 Ninnion Tablet
 Niobe
 Niobe (Argive)
 Niobid Painter
 Niobids
 Nireus
 Nireus (mythology)
 Nisa (Boeotia)
 Nisa (Megaris)
 Nisaea
 Nisos
 Nolan amphora
 Nomia
 Nomos (music)
 Nomos (mythology)
 Nonacris
 Nonnus
 Norakos
 Northampton Group
 Nostoi
 Nostos
 Notion
 Noumenia
 Nous
 Nu (letter)
 Nudium
 Numenius of Apamea
 Numenius of Heraclea
 Numisianus
 Nutrition in Classical Antiquity
 Nycteïs
 Nycteus
 Nyctimene
 Nyctimus
 Nymph
 Nymphaeum (Olympia)
 Nymphai Hyperboreioi
 Nymphis
 Nymphodorus (physician)
 Nymphodorus of Abdera
 Nympholepsy
 Nysa
 Nysa (Boeotia)
 Nysa (Euboea)
 Nysiads
 Nyx

O 

 Oa (Attica)
 Oaxes
 Obelism
 Obol
 Ocalea
 Ocalea (town)
 Oceanids
 Ochimus
 Ocridion
 Octaeteris
 Ocypete
 Ocyrhoe
 Odeon (building)
 Odeon of Agrippa
 Odeon of Athens
 Odeon of Herodes Atticus
 Odyssean gods
 Odysseus
 Odysseus Acanthoplex
 Odysseus in the Underworld krater
 Odyssey
 Oea (Attica)
 Oeae
 Oeagrus
 Oebalus
 Oebotas of Dyme
 Oeceus
 Oechalia (Aetolia)
 Oechalia (Arcadia)
 Oechalia (Euboea)
 Oechalia (Messenia)
 Oechalia (Thessaly)
 Oechalia (Trachis)
 Oeconomicus
 Oedipodea
 Oedipus
 Oedipus (Euripides)
 Oedipus at Colonus
 Oedipus Rex
 Oeneon
 Oeneus
 Oeniadae
 Oenochoe
 Oenoe
 Oenoe (Attica)
 Oenoe (Corinthia)
 Oenoe (Elis)
 Oenoe (Icaria)
 Oenoe (Marathon)
 Oenomaus
 Oenomaus of Gadara
 Oenone
 Oenopides
 Oenopion
 Oenotropae
 Oenotrus
 Oeonus
 Oestrus (mythology)
 Oesyme
 Oetaea
 Oetaei
 Oetylus
 Oeum
 Oeum (Locris)
 Oeum Cerameicum
 Oeum Deceleicum
 Ogyges
 Ogygia
 Oicles
 Oikeiôsis
 Oikistes
 Oikonomos
 Oikos
 Oileus
 Oinochoe by the Shuvalov Painter (Berlin F2414)
 Oizys
 Olaeis
 Old Comedy
 Old Greek
 Old Man of the Sea
 Old Oenia
 Old Temple of Athena
 Older Parthenon
 Olen
 Olenus
 Olenus (Aetolia)
 Olenus (Achaea)
 Olethros
 Olganos
 Olive branch
 Olive wreath
 Olizon
 Oloosson
 Olophyxus
 Olpae
 Olpae (Locris)
 Oltos
 Olymos
 Olympe
 Olympia, Greece
 Olympia Master
 Olympiad
 Olympias (trireme)
 Olympic Truce
 Olympic winners of the Archaic period
 Olympiodorus the Elder
 Olympiodorus the Younger
 Olympus (musician)
 Olynthiacs
 Olynthus
 Omega
 Omicron
 Omophagia
 Omphale
 Omphalos
 Omphalos of Delphi
 On a Wound by Premeditation
 On Conoids and Spheroids
 On Floating Bodies
 On Horsemanship
 On Ideas
 On Justice
 On Sizes and Distances (Hipparchus)
 On Spirals
 On the Chersonese
 On the Crown
 On the Equilibrium of Planes
 On the False Embassy
 On the Halonnesus
 On the Heavens
 On the Liberty of the Rhodians
 On the Malice of Herodotus
 On the Murder of Eratosthenes
 On the Nature of Man
 On the Navy Boards
 On the Peace
 On the Sacred Disease
 On the Sizes and Distances (Aristarchus)
 On the Sphere and Cylinder
 On Virtue
 Onasander
 Onatas
 Oncae
 Onceium
 Onchestos
 Onchestos (mythology)
 Oncius
 Oneirocritica
 Oneiros
 Onesicritus
 Onesilus
 Onesimos
 Onomacles
 Onomacritus
 Onomarchus
 Onomasti komodein
 Onomastus of Smyrna
 Onthyrius
 Ophelestes
 Opheltes
 Opheltes (mythology)
 Opheltius
 Ophion
 Ophiotaurus
 Ophiussa
 Ophryneion
 Opisthodomos
 Opites
 Ops (mythology)
 Opsis
 Opson
 Opsophagos
 Optative
 Opuntian Locris
 Opus (Elis)
 Opus, Greece
 Opus (mythology)
 Orchamus
 Orchomenus
 Orchomenus (Arcadia)
 Orchomenus (Boeotia)
 Orchomenus (Euboea)
 Orchomenus (Thessaly)
 Oread
 Oreithyia Painter
 Oresas
 Oresteia
 Orestes
 Orestes (play)
 Orestes Pursued by the Furies
 Orestheus
 Orestis
 Orgia
 Oribasius
 Oricum
 Orientalizing period
 Orion
 Orithyia
 Orithyia of Athens
 Orithyia (Amazon)
 Ormenium
 Ormenus
 Orneae
 Orneus
 Ornithomancy
 Ornytion
 Ornytus
 Orobiae
 Oropos (Epirus)
 Orpheus
 Orpheus and Eurydice
 Orphic Egg
 Orphism
 Orphne
 Orseis
 Orsilochus
 Orsinome
 Orsippus
 Orthe (Thessaly)
 Orthostates
 Orthotes
 Orthrus
 Orus (mythology)
 Orya (play)
 Oschophoria
 Osmida
 Ossa cave
 Ostomachion
 Ostracism
 Otanes
 Othorus
 Othreis
 Othryades
 Othryoneus
 Otrera
 Otryne
 Otus of Cyllene
 Ourea
 Ousia
 Outis
 Overline
 Owl of Athena
 Oxford Palmette Class
 Oxyathres of Heraclea
 Oxybeles
 Oxygala
 Oxylus
 Oxylus (son of Haemon)
 Oxyntes
 Oxythemis of Coroneia
 Ozolian Locris

P 

 Paean
 Paean (god)
 Paeania
 Paeon
 Paeon (father of Agastrophus)
 Paeon (son of Antilochus)
 Paeon (son of Poseidon)
 Paeon of Elis
 Paeonidae
 Paestan vase painting
 Paestum
 Pagae
 Pagondas
 Paideia
 Painter of Acropolis 606
 Painter of Berlin A 34
 Painter of Berlin 1686
 Painter of Munich 1410
 Painter of Nicosia Olpe
 Painter of Palermo 489
 Painter of the Berlin Dancing Girl
 Painter of the Dresden Lekanis
 Painter of the Vatican Mourner
 Pair of athletes (Delphi)
 Paired opposites
 Palace of Nestor
 Palaechthon
 Palaestinus
 Palaestra
 Palaestra at Delphi
 Palaestra at Olympia
 Palaestra (mythology)
 Palaikastro Kouros
 Palamedes
 Palici
 Palioxis
 Palladium
 Pallake
 Pallantides
 Pallas
 Pallas (Giant)
 Pallas of Arcadia
 Pallas (son of Evander)
 Pallas (son of Pandion)
 Pallas (Titan)
 Pallene (Attica)
 Pamboeotia
 Pambotadae
 Pammenes of Thebes
 Pammon
 Pamphaios
 Pamphilus
 Pamphylian Greek
 Pamphylus
 Pan
 Pan Painter
 Panacea
 Panaenus
 Panaetius
 Panares
 Panathenaic amphora
 Panathenaic Games
 Panathenaic Stadium
 Panchaia (island)
 Pancrates of Athens
 Pandaie
 Pandareus
 Pandarus
 Pandia
 Pandia (festival)
 Pandion (hero)
 Pandion (mythology)
 Pandion I
 Pandion II
 Pandionis
 Pandora
 Pandora's box
 Pandora of Thessaly
 Pandorus
 Pandosia (Epirus)
 Pandroseion
 Pandrosus
 Pandura
 Panegyris
 Panhellenic Games
 Panhellenion
 Panionium
 Pankration
 Panopeus
 Panopeus (mythology)
 Panoply
 Panormus
 Panther Painter
 Panthoides
 Panthous
 Pantites
 Pantodapoi
 Panyassis
 Paphos
 Pappus of Alexandria
 Papyrus Oxyrhynchus 221
 Papyrus Oxyrhynchus 223
 Papyrus Oxyrhynchus 224
 Papyrus Oxyrhynchus 225
 Papyrus Oxyrhynchus 226
 Papyrus Oxyrhynchus 413
 Parabasis
 Paradox of the Court
 Paragraphos
 Paralia (Attica)
 Parallel Lives
 Paralus (ship)
 Paralus and Xanthippus
 Parauaea
 Parergon
 Parian Chronicle
 Parian marble
 Paris
 Parmenides
 Parmenides (dialogue)
 Parmeniskos group
 Paroikoi
 Paros
 Parrhasius (painter)
 Parrhasius (son of Lycaon)
 Partheniae
 Parthenius of Nicaea
 Parthenon
 Parthenon Frieze
 Parthenopeus
 Participle
 Pasicles of Thebes
 Pasion
 Pasiphaë
 Pasithea
 Passaron
 Patera
 Patreus
 Patro the Epicurean
 Patrocles (geographer)
 Patroclus
 Patroclus (admiral)
 Pausanias (geographer)
 Pausanias of Athens
 Pausanias of Sicily
 Pausanias of Sparta
 Pausanias the Regent
 Pausanias' description of Delphi
 Pausias
 Peace (play)
 Peace of Antalcidas
 Peace of Callias
 Peace of Nicias
 Peace of Philocrates
 Peak sanctuaries
 Pedanius Dioscorides
 Pedasus
 Pederasty in ancient Greece
 Pedestal of Agrippa
 Pediments of the Parthenon
 Pegaeae
 Pegasides
 Pegasus
 Peiraikos
 Peirasia
 Peirous
 Peisander
 Peisander (navarch)
 Peisander (oligarch)
 Peisenor
 Peisistratus of Orchomenus
 Peisistratus of Pylos
 Peitharchia
 Peitho
 Pelagon
 Pelanor
 Pelasgia
 Pelasgians
 Pelasgic wall
 Pelasgiotis
 Pelasgus
 Pelasgus of Argos
 Peleces
 Peleiades
 Peleus
 Peliades
 Pelias
 Peliganes
 Pelike
 Pelike with actors preparing
 Pelinna
 Pella
 Pella curse tablet
 Pellana
 Pellene
 Pelopia
 Pelopia (daughter of Thyestes)
 Pelopidas
 Pelopion
 Peloponnese
 Peloponnesian League
 Peloponnesian War
 Pelops
 Pelops (mythology)
 Pelops (son of Agamemnon)
 Pelops of Sparta
 Peltast
 Peneleos
 Penelope
 Penestai
 Peneus
 Pentathlon
 Pentecontaetia
 Penteconter
 Pentele
 Penthesilea
 Penthesilea Painter
 Pentheus
 Penthilus of Mycenae
 Penthus
 Peplos
 Peplos Kore
 Pepromene
 Peraea (Euboea)
 Perdix (mythology)
 Peregrinus Proteus
 Pergamon
 Pergamon Altar
 Pergase
 Periander
 Peribolos
 Pericles
 Pericles the Younger
 Pericles with the Corinthian helmet
 Periclymenus
 Periclytus
 Perictione
 Perieres
 Perieres of Messenia
 Perikeiromene
 Perileos
 Perimede
 Perimedes
 Perioeci
 Peripatetic school
 Peripatos (Akropolis)
 Peripeteia
 Periphas
 Periphas (king of Attica)
 Periphetes
 Peripteros
 Perispomenon
 Peristasis
 Peristhenes
 Perithoedae
 Peritrope
 Perizoma Group
 Peronai
 Perrhaebi
 Perrhaebia
 Perrhidae
 Persaeus
 Perse
 Perseides
 Persephone
 Persephone Painter
 Perserschutt
 Perses (brother of Hesiod)
 Perses of Colchis
 Perses (son of Perseus)
 Perses (Titan)
 Perseus
 Perseus (geometer)
 Perseus of Pylos
 Persian Rider
 Persica (Ctesias)
 Petalism
 Petasos
 Peteon
 Petraeus (mythology)
 Pezhetairos
 Phaeax (architect)
 Phaeax (orator)
 Phaedo
 Phaedo of Elis
 Phaedra
 Phaedra complex
 Phaedrus (Athenian)
 Phaedrus the Epicurean
 Phaenarete
 Phaenias of Eresus
 Phaenon
 Phaenops
 Phaethon
 Phaethon of Syria
 Phaethon (play)
 Phaethusa
 Phaistos Disc
 Phalaikos
 Phalanthus of Tarentum
 Phalerum
 Phalerus
 Phanas of Pellene
 Phanes
 Phanes (coin issuer)
 Phanias (Athenian commander)
 Phantasiai
 Phantes
 Phanto of Phlius
 Phanus (mythology)
 Phara
 Pharae (Boeotia)
 Pharae (Crete)
 Pharis
 Pharmakos
 Phayllos of Croton
 Phegaea (Aigeis)
 Phegaea (Pandionis)
 Phegeus
 Phegeus of Psophis
 Phegus
 Pheidippides
 Pheidon
 Pheidon I
 Phelloe
 Pheme
 Phemius
 Phereclus
 Pherecrates
 Pherecydes of Athens
 Pherecydes of Leros
 Pherecydes of Syros
 Pheres
 Pherusa
 Phi
 Phiale of Megara
 Phiale Painter
 Phialo
 Phidias
 Phidippus
 Phigalia
 Philaemon
 Philaenis
 Philagrius of Epirus
 Philaidae
 Philammon
 Philander (mythology)
 Philemon (poet)
 Philia
 Philia (Greco-Roman magic)
 Philinus of Athens
 Philinus of Cos
 Philip II of Macedon
 Philip of Opus
 Philippeioi
 Philippeion
 Philippi
 Philippic
 Philippides (comic poet)
 Philippus of Chollidae
 Philippus of Croton
 Philiscus of Aegina
 Philiscus of Corcyra
 Philistus
 Philo of Byzantium
 Philo of Larissa
 Philo the Dialectician
 Philochorus
 Philocles
 Philoctetes
 Philoctetes (Euripides play)
 Philoctetes (Sophocles play)
 Philodemus (mythology)
 Philodice
 Philoetius (Odyssey)
 Philoi
 Philolaus
 Philomelus
 Philon
 Philonides of Laodicea
 Philonoe
 Philophrosyne
 Philopoemen
 Philosopher king
 Philostratus
 Philostratus of Lemnos
 Philostratus the Younger
 Philotas (Antiochid general)
 Philotas (musician)
 Philotes
 Philotimo
 Philoxenus (physician)
 Philoxenus of Cythera
 Philoxenus of Eretria
 Philyllius
 Philyra (mythology)
 Philyra (Oceanid)
 Phineus
 Phintias
 Phintys
 Phlegethon
 Phlegra
 Phlegyas
 Phlias
 Phlius
 Phlya
 Phlyax play
 Phobetor
 Phobos
 Phocais
 Phocion
 Phocis
 Phocus
 Phocus of Aegina
 Phocus of Boeotia
 Phocus of Corinth
 Phoebe (Greek myth)
 Phoebe of Messenia
 Phoebe (Titaness)
 Phoebidas
 Phoenix (son of Agenor)
 Phoenix (son of Amyntor)
 Pholoe Painter
 Pholus (mythology)
 Phonoi
 Phora
 Phorbas
 Phorbas (king of Argos)
 Phorbas of Elis
 Phorbas of Thessaly
 Phorbus (mythology)
 Phorcys
 Phorcys of Phrygia
 Phorminx
 Phormio
 Phoroneus
 Phoronis (Hellanicus)
 Phoros
 Phradmon
 Phrasikleia Kore
 Phrasimus
 Phrasius
 Phratry
 Phrearrhii
 Phrenius
 Phrike
 Phrixus
 Phronesis
 Phrontis
 Phrontis (son of Phrixus)
 Phrourarch
 Phryctoria
 Phrygian helmet
 Phrygillus
 Phrygius
 Phryne
 Phrynichus (comic poet)
 Phrynichus (oligarch)
 Phrynichus (tragic poet)
 Phrynon
 Phrynos
 Phrynos Painter
 Phthia
 Phthia (mythology)
 Phthisis
 Phthonus
 Phye
 Phylace (Thessaly)
 Phylacides
 Phylacus
 Phylarch
 Phylas
 Phyle
 Phyle (Attica)
 Phyle Campaign
 Phyle Cave
 Phyleus
 Phyllis (river god)
 Phylo (Odyssey)
 Phylonomus
 Physcoa
 Physcus
 Physis
 Phytalus
 Pi (letter)
 Picolous
 Pierian Spring
 Pierus of Emathia
 Pileus (hat)
 Pimpleia
 Pinakion
 Pinax
 Pindar
 Pindar's First Olympian Ode
 Pindus
 Pioneer Group
 Piraeus
 Piraeus Apollo
 Piraeus Artemis
 Piraeus Athena
 Piraeus Painter
 Pirene (fountain)
 Pirene (mythology)
 Pirithous
 Pisa
 Pisidice
 Pisistratus
 Pisticci Painter
 Pistis
 Pistoxenos Painter
 Pitane (Laconia)
 Pithos
 Pithus
 Pitsa panels
 Pittacus of Mytilene
 Pittheus
 Pitys (mythology)
 Placenta cake
 Plague of Athens
 Plataea
 Plato
 Plato (comic poet)
 Plato's five regimes
 Plato's number
 Plato's political philosophy
 Plato's theory of soul
 Plato's unwritten doctrines
 Platonic Academy
 Platonic epistemology
 Platonic idealism
 Platonic realism
 Platonism
 Pleiades
 Pleione
 Pleistarchus
 Pleisthenes
 Pleistoanax
 Plethron
 Pleuron
 Pleuron of Aetolia
 Plexippus
 Plotheia
 Plotinus
 Plouto (Oceanid)
 Ploutonion
 Ploutonion at Hierapolis
 Pluralist school
 Plutarch
 Pluto
 Plutus
 Plutus (play)
 Plynteria
 Pneuma
 Pneuma (Stoic)
 Pneumatic school
 Pnyx
 Podalirius
 Podarces
 Podes
 Poeas
 Poena
 Poiesis
 Polemarch
 Polemarchus
 Polemic
 Polemocrates (physician)
 Polemon
 Polemon of Athens
 Polemos
 Poliporthes
 Polis
 Politarch
 Politeia
 Polites (friend of Odysseus)
 Polites of Troy
 Politics (Aristotle)
 Polium 
 Polos
 Polos Painter
 Polus
 Polyaenus of Lampsacus
 Polyandrion
 Polybius
 Polybolos
 Polybotes
 Polybus (physician)
 Polybus of Corinth
 Polybus of Sicyon
 Polybus (son of Antenor)
 Polycaon
 Polychares of Messenia
 Polycles (155 BC)
 Polycles (370 BCE)
 Polycrates
 Polyctor
 Polydamas
 Polydamas of Pharsalus
 Polydamas of Skotoussa
 Polydamna
 Polydectes
 Polydectes of Sparta
 Polydorus
 Polydorus of Sparta
 Polydorus of Thebes
 Polydorus of Troy
 Polydorus (son of Astyanax)
 Polygnotos (vase painter)
 Polygnotus
 Polyhymnia
 Polyidus
 Polyidus (poet)
 Polyidus of Corinth
 Polyidus of Thessaly
 Polymatheia
 Polymedes of Argos
 Polymedon
 Polymele
 Polymestor
 Polymnestus
 Polypheides
 Polyphemos Painter
 Polyphemos reclining and holding a drinking bowl
 Polyphemus
 Polyphemus (Argonaut)
 Polyphrasmon
 Polypoetes
 Polystratus
 Polystratus the Epicurean
 Polyxena
 Polyxenidas
 Polyxenus
 Polyxo
 Ponos
 Pontic Group
 Pontus
 Poppy goddess
 Porphyrion
 Porthaon
 Portico of the Aetolians
 Porus (Attica)
 Porus (mythology)
 Poseidon
 Poseidon of Melos
 Posidippus (comic poet)
 Posidippus (epigrammatic poet)
 Posidonius
 Potamides
 Potamo of Mytilene
 Potamoi
 Potamon
 Potamus (Attica)
 Potamus Deiradiotes
 Potnia
 Potnia Theron
 Potone
 Pottery of ancient Greece
 Pous
 Prasiae
 Pratinas
 Praxagoras
 Praxagoras of Athens
 Praxias and Androsthenes
 Praxidice
 Praxiphanes
 Praxiteles
 Praxithea
 Pre-Greek substrate
 Pre-Socratic philosophy
 Precepts of Chiron
 Priam
 Priam Painter
 Priapus
 Priasus
 Priene
 Priene Inscription
 Priestess of Hera at Argos
 Prince of the Lilies
 Princeton Painter
 Probalinthus
 Probolê
 Proboulos
 Procles
 Proclus
 Procne
 Procris
 Prodicus
 Prodromoi
 Proetus
 Proetus (son of Abas)
 Prohairesis
 Proioxis
 Prokles (Pergamon)
 Promachos
 Promachus
 Promachus of Macedon
 Promachus of Pellene
 Promanteia
 Promedon
 Prometheia
 Prometheus
 Prometheus Bound
 Prometheus the Fire-Bringer
 Prometheus Unbound (Aeschylus)
 Pronax
 Pronous
 Pronunciation of Ancient Greek in teaching
 Prophasis
 Propylaea
 Propylaea (Acropolis of Athens)
 Prorrhesis
 Prosodion
 Prosody (Greek)
 Prospalta (Attica)
 Prostitution in ancient Greece
 Prostyle
 Prosymna
 Prosymnus
 Protagonist
 Protagoras
 Protagoras (dialogue)
 Protesilaus
 Proteus
 Proteus (Greek myth)
 Prothoenor
 Prothous
 Protogeneia
 Protogenes
 Protogeometric style
 Protomachus (Athenian general)
 Protostates
 Providence Painter
 Proxenus of Atarneus
 Proxenus of Boeotia
 Proxeny
 Prytaneion
 Prytanis (king of Sparta)
 Psalacantha
 Psamathe (Nereid)
 Psaphis
 Pseras
 Pseudanor
 Pseudo-Chalkidian vase painting
 Pseudo-Demosthenes
 Pseudo-Scymnus
 Pseudodipteral
 Pseudoperipteros
 Psi
 Psi and phi type figurine
 Psiax
 Psiloi
 Psilosis
 Psophis
 Psophis (mythology)
 Psychagogy
 Psyche
 Psychro Cave
 Psykter
 Ptelea (Attica)
 Pterelaus
 Pterelaus (son of Lelex)
 Pterelaus (son of Taphius)
 Pteruges
 Ptolemais of Cyrene
 Ptolemy (somatophylax)
 Ptolemy of Epirus
 Ptolemy of Thebes
 Ptolichus
 Ptoon Painter
 Pyanopsia
 Pygmalion
 Pyknon
 Pylades
 Pylaemenes
 Pylaeus
 Pylaon
 Pylene
 Pylos Combat Agate
 Pylus
 Pyracmus of Euboea
 Pyraechmes
 Pyramus and Thisbe
 Pyrausta
 Pyre of Heracles
 Pyrgoteles
 Pyrilampes
 Pyroeis
 Pyrrha of Thessaly
 Pyrrhic War
 Pyrrhichios
 Pyrrhichos
 Pyrrho
 Pyrrhonism
 Pyrrhus of Epirus
 Pyrrhus' invasion of the Peloponnese
 Pyrrhus of Athens
 Pythagoras
 Pythagoras (boxer)
 Pythagoras (sculptor)
 Pythagoras of Laconia
 Pythagoras the Spartan
 Pythagorean astronomical system
 Pythagorean interval
 Pythagorean tuning
 Pythagoreanism
 Pythagoreion
 Pytheas
 Pythia
 Pythian Games
 Pythias
 Pythion
 Pythion of Megara
 Pythius of Priene
 Python (mythology)
 Python (painter)
 Python of Aenus
 Pytia
 Pyxis (vessel)

Q 

 Quadratrix of Hippias
 Quantitative metathesis
 Quintus Smyrnaeus

R 

 Rampin Rider
 Rape in Greek mythology
 Rape of Persephone
 Rarus
 Rational animal
 Red Figure Pelike with an Actor Dressed as a Bird
 Red-figure pottery
 Reed Painter
 Regina Vasorum
 Regions of ancient Greece
 Representation of women in Athenian tragedy
 Republic (Plato)
 Republic (Zeno)
 Resting Satyr
 Returns from Troy
 Revelers Vase
 Rhacius
 Rhadamanthus
 Rhadine and Leontichus
 Rhamnus (Crete)
 Rhaphanidosis
 Rhapso
 Rhapsode
 Rharian Field
 Rhaucus
 Rhea
 Rhebas (river)
 Rhene
 Rhesus (play)
 Rhesus of Thrace
 Rhetoric (Aristotle)
 Rhexenor
 Rhianus
 Rhieia
 Rhipe
 Rhittenia
 Rhium (Messenia)
 Rho
 Rhodian vase painting
 Rhodius
 Rhodope
 Rhodos
 Rhoecus
 Rhoeo
 Rhoiteion
 Rhombus formation
 Rhomos
 Rhoptron
 Rhynchus (Greece)
 Rhytium
 Rhyton
 Riace bronzes
 Rider Amphora
 Rider Painter
 Ring of Gyges
 Ripheus
 Rival Lovers
 Rod of Asclepius
 Roman–Greek wars
 Romanization of Greek
 Rough breathing
 Royal formula of Parthian coinage
 Rufus of Ephesus
 Running in Ancient Greece
 Rycroft Painter

S 

 Sabouroff head
 Sacred Band of Thebes
 Sacred caves of Crete
 Sacred Gate
 Sacred Way
 Sacrificial tripod
 Sacrificial victims of Minotaur
 Sage
 Salamis
 Salamis Stone
 Salamis Tablet
 Salinon
 Salmacis
 Salmacis (fountain)
 Salmoneus
 Salpe
 Salpinx
 Same (Homer)
 Sami
 Samia (play)
 Samian Sibyl
 Samian vase painting
 Samian War
 Samothrace temple complex
 Sampi
 San (letter)
 Sanctuary of Aphrodite Aphrodisias
 Sanctuary of Aphrodite Paphia
 Sanctuary of Apollo Maleatas
 Sanctuary of Artemis Orthia
 Sanctuary of Pandion
 Sanctuary of the Mother of Gods and Aphrodite
 Sanctuary of Zeus Polieus
 Sangarius
 Sannyrion
 Saon
 Sapphic stanza
 Sappho
 Sappho Painter
 Sarissa
 Sarissophoroi
 Sarpedon
 Sarpedon (Trojan War hero)
 Satyr
 Satyr play
 Satyros
 Satyrus the Peripatetic
 Scamander
 Scamander of Boeotia
 Scamandrius
 Scambonidae
 Scaphe
 Scaphism
 Schedius
 Scheria
 Schoeneus
 Schoenus (Boeotia)
 Scholarch
 School of Abdera
 Science in classical antiquity
 Sciritae
 Sciritis
 Sciron
 Scirtonium
 Scirtus (mythology)
 Scirum
 Scirus (Arcadia)
 Scolus (Boeotia)
 Scopas
 Sculpture of a horse (Olympia B 1741)
 Scylla
 Scymnus
 Scytale
 Scythian archers
 Second Alcibiades
 Second Ancient Theatre, Larissa
 Second Athenian League
 Second Battle of Lamia
 Second declension
 Second Macedonian War
 Second Messenian War
 Second Persian invasion of Greece
 Second Philippic
 Second Sacred War
 Second Temple of Hera (Paestum)
 Second War of the Diadochi
 Seikilos epitaph
 Seisachtheia
 Selene
 Seleucus of Alexandria
 Seleucus of Seleucia
 Sellasia (Laconia)
 Selloi
 Semachidae
 Semachos
 Semele
 Semonides of Amorgos
 Semystra
 Senex amans
 Serapion of Alexandria
 Serenus of Antinoöpolis
 Sestos
 Seven against Thebes
 Seven Against Thebes
 Seven Sages of Greece
 Severe style
 Shambling Bull Painter
 Shield bearer
 Shield of Achilles
 Shield of Heracles
 Ship of State
 Shirt of Nessus
 Shuvalov Painter
 Siana Cup
 Sibyl
 Sibyl rock
 Sibyna
 Sibyrtius
 Sicilian Expedition
 Sicilian vase painting
 Sicilian Wars
 Sicinnus
 Sicyon
 Sicyon (mythology)
 Sicyonian Treasury
 Side (mythology)
 Siege of Athens (287 BC)
 Siege of Athens and Piraeus (87–86 BC)
 Siege of Eretria
 Siege of Gythium
 Siege of Lamia
 Siege of Lilybaeum (278 BC)
 Siege of Mantinea
 Siege of Medion
 Siege of Megalopolis
 Siege of Naxos (499 BC)
 Siege of Perinthus
 Siege of Plataea
 Siege of Rhodes (305–304 BC)
 Siege of Sparta
 Siege of Syracuse (213–212 BC)
 Siege of Syracuse (278 BC)
 Siege of Syracuse (311–309 BC)
 Siege of Syracuse (343 BC)
 Siege of Syracuse (397 BC)
 Siege of Thebes (292–291 BC)
 Siege of Tyre (332 BC)
 Sigma
 Sikyonioi
 Silanion
 Silanus of Ambracia
 Silenus
 Sileraioi
 Silloi
 Silver age
 Silver stater with a turtle
 Sima
 Simmias (explorer)
 Simmias of Rhodes
 Simmias of Syracuse
 Simmias of Thebes
 Simon of Athens
 Simon the Shoemaker
 Simonides of Ceos
 Sinis
 Sinon
 Sinope
 Sintice
 Siphnian Treasury
 Siproites
 Siren
 Siren Painter
 Sirras
 Sisyphus
 Sisyphus (dialogue)
 Sisyphus Painter
 Sithon
 Six's technique
 Skene
 Skeptouchos
 Skeuophoros
 Skira
 Skolion
 Skyphos
 Skyros
 Skythes
 Slavery in ancient Greece
 Smikros
 Smilis
 Smooth breathing
 Smyrna
 Snub-nose painter
 Social War (220–217 BC)
 Social War (357–355 BC)
 Sock and buskin
 Socrates
 Socrates of Achaea
 Socrates the Younger
 Socratic dialogue
 Socratic method
 Socratic problem
 Socratic questioning
 Socus
 Sokles
 Sollium
 Solon
 Solonian Constitution
 Solymus
 Somatophylakes
 Sons of Aegyptus
 Soos (king of Sparta)
 Sophilos
 Sophist
 Sophist (dialogue)
 Sophistic works of Antiphon
 Sophocles
 Sophron
 Sophroniscus
 Sophrosyne
 Sopolis of Macedon
 Soranus of Ephesus
 Sosicrates
 Sosigenes (Stoic)
 Sosigenes of Alexandria
 Sosigenes the Peripatetic
 Sosipolis (god)
 Sositheus
 Sostratos of Aegina
 Sostratos of Chios
 Sostratus of Dyme
 Sostratus of Pellene
 Sostratus of Sicyon
 Sosus of Pergamon
 Sotades
 Sotades of Crete
 Sotades Painter
 Soter
 Soter (daimon)
 Soteria (festival)
 Soteria
 Soteridas of Epidaurus
 Sotion
 Sotira (physician)
 Sounion
 Sounion Kouros
 Sousta
 South Italian ancient Greek pottery
 South Stoa I (Athens)
 Sparta
 Sparta (mythology)
 Spartan army
 Spartan Constitution
 Spartan hegemony
 Spartan naval art: Ivory plaque
 Spartia temple
 Spartiate
 Spartocid dynasty
 Spartoi
 Spercheides
 Speusippus
 Sphaeria
 Sphaerics
 Sphaerus
 Sphendale
 Spherical Earth
 Sphettus
 Sphodrias
 Sphyrelaton
 Spintharus of Corinth
 Spool-shaped pyxis (NAMA 5225)
 Sport in ancient Greek art
 Sporus of Nicaea
 Spoudaiogeloion
 Spurious diphthong
 Stadion (unit)
 Stadion (running race)
 Stadium at Nemea
 Stadium at Olympia
 Stadium of Delphi
 Stag Hunt Mosaic
 Stagira (ancient city)
 Stamnos
 Standing Youth (Munich SL 162)
 Staphylus
 Staphylus (son of Dionysus)
 Staphylus of Naucratis
 Stasander
 Stasanor
 Stasimon
 Stasinus
 Stasis
 Stater
 Statue of the priestess Aristonoe
 Statue of Zeus at Olympia
 Statuette of hoplite (Berlin Antiquities Collection Misc. 7470)
 Steiria
 Stele of Aristion
 Stele of Arniadas
 Stentor
 Stephane
 Sterope
 Sterope (Pleiad)
 Sterope of Tegea
 Stesichorus
 Stesicles
 Stesimbrotos of Thasos
 Stheneboea
 Sthenelaidas
 Sthenele
 Sthenelus
 Sthenelus (son of Capaneus)
 Sthenelus of Mycenae
 Sthennis
 Stheno
 Stichius (mythology)
 Stichomythia
 Stilbe
 Stilbon
 Stilpo
 Stirrup jar
 Stoa
 Stoa Basileios
 Stoa of Attalos
 Stoa of Eumenes
 Stoibadeion
 Stoic categories
 Stoic logic
 Stoic passions
 Stoic physics
 Stoichedon
 Stoicism
 Strabo
 Strangford Apollo
 Strategos
 Stratichus
 Straticles
 Strato of Lampsacus
 Stratobates
 Stratocles
 Stratonice
 Stratonice of Pontus
 Stratonicus of Athens
 Strattis
 Strattis of Chios
 Strombichides
 Strongylion
 Strophe
 Strophius
 Strymon
 Studies on Homer and the Homeric Age
 Stygne
 Stylobate
 Stymphalian birds
 Stymphalus
 Stymphalus (Arcadia)
 Stymphalus (son of Elatus)
 Styra
 Styx
 Subjunctive
 Sublunary sphere
 Substantial form
 Successions of Philosophers
 Sufax
 Suicide of Ajax Vase
 Suitors of Helen
 Suitors of Penelope
 Sukhumi stela
 Superposed order
 Susarion
 Swallow song of Rhodes
 Swing Painter
 Syagrus (poet)
 Sybaris (mythology)
 Sybridae
 Syceus
 Sycophancy
 Syennesis of Cyprus
 Syleus (mythology)
 Syloson (son of Calliteles)
 Syme (mythology)
 Symmoria
 Symplegades
 Sympoliteia
 Symposium
 Symposium (Xenophon)
 Synedrion
 Synizesis
 Synoecism
 Synoikia
 Syntagmatarchis
 Sypalettus
 Syrinx
 Syrtos
 Syssitia

T 

 Taenarus
 Tagmatarchis
 Tagus
 Tainia
 Talares
 Talaria
 Talaus
 Taleides Painter
 Talos
 Talos (inventor)
 Talthybius
 Tanagra figurine
 Tanais Tablets
 Tantalus
 Tantalus (mythology)
 Tantalus (son of Broteas)
 Tantalus (son of Menelaus)
 Taphians
 Taphius
 Taras
 Taraxippus
 Targitaos
 Tarporley Painter
 Tarquinia Painter
 Tarrha
 Tartarus
 Tau
 Taurus
 Taxiarch
 Taxiles (Pontic army officer)
 Taygete
 Techne
 Tecmessa
 Tectamus
 Tegea
 Tegea (Crete)
 Tegeates
 Tegyra
 Tegyrios
 Teichoscopy
 Teithras
 Talaemenes
 Telauges
 Telchines
 Teleboans
 Telecleia
 Telecleides
 Telecles
 Teleclus
 Teledice
 Telegonus (son of Odysseus)
 Telegony
 Telemachus
 Telemachy
 Telemus
 Teleon
 Telephassa
 Telephus
 Telepylos
 Teles of Megara
 Telesarchus (military commander)
 Telesarchus of Samos
 Telesilla
 Telesphorus (mythology)
 Telestas
 Telesterion
 Telesto
 Telete
 Teleutias
 Tellis of Sicyon
 Tellus of Athens
 Telmius
 Telos
 Telycrates
 Temenos
 Temenus
 Temenus (mythology)
 Temple C (Selinus)
 Temple E (Selinus)
 Temple F (Selinus)
 Temple of Aphaea
 Temple of Aphrodite at Acrocorinth
 Temple of Aphrodite, Knidos
 Temple of Aphrodite, Kythira
 Temple of Aphrodite, Sparta
 Temple of Aphrodite Urania
 Temple of Apollo (Delphi)
 Temple of Apollo (Syracuse)
 Temple of Apollo Patroos
 Temple of Artemis
 Temple of Artemis, Corfu
 Temple of Artemis Amarynthia
 Temple of Artemis Ephesia
 Temple of Asclepius, Epidaurus
 Temple of Athena (Paestum)
 Temple of Athena (Syracuse)
 Temple of Athena Alea
 Temple of Athena Lindia
 Temple of Athena Nike
 Temple of Athena Polias (Priene)
 Temple of Concordia, Agrigento
 Temple of Demeter Amphictyonis
 Temple of Dionysus, Naxos
 Temple of Dionysus Lysios
 Temple of Hephaestus
 Temple of Hera Lacinia
 Temple of Hera, Mon Repos
 Temple of Hera, Olympia
 Temple of Hera Lacinia
 Temple of Heracles, Agrigento
 Temple of Isthmia
 Temple of Olympian Zeus, Agrigento
 Temple of Olympian Zeus, Athens
 Temple of Poseidon, Sounion
 Temple of Poseidon (Tainaron)
 Temple of Poseidon (Taranto)
 Temple of Sangri
 Temple of the Delians
 Temple of Zeus, Olympia
 Temple of Zeus Kyrios
 Ten Thousand
 Tenages
 Tenerus (son of Apollo)
 Tenes
 Tereus
 Tereus (play)
 Term logic
 Termerus
 Terpander
 Terpsichore
 Terpsimbrotos
 Terpsion
 Tetartemorion
 Tethys
 Tetradrachm
 Tetrapharmacum
 Tetrapharmakos
 Tetrapolis (Attica)
 Teucer
 Teumessian fox
 Teutamides
 Teuthis
 Teuthras
 Teuthras (mythology)
 Thalassa
 Thalatta! Thalatta!
 Thales (painter)
 Thales of Miletus
 Thales's theorem
 Thaletas
 Thalia (Grace)
 Thalia (Muse)
 Thalia (Nereid)
 Thalia (nymph)
 Thalpius (mythology)
 Thalysia
 Thamyris
 Thanatos
 Thanatos Painter
 Thargelia
 Thasian rebellion
 Thasus
 Thaumacus (mythology)
 Thaumas
 The Affecter
 Theaetetus (dialogue)
 Theaetetus (mathematician)
 Theagenes of Megara
 Theagenes of Patras
 Theagenes of Rhegium
 Theagenes of Thasos
 Theages
 Theandrios
 Theano
 Theano of Troy
 Theano (philosopher)
 Thearides
 Theatre of ancient Greece
 Theatre of Dionysus
 Thebaid
 Theban Cycle
 Theban hegemony
 Theban kings in Greek mythology
 Theban–Spartan War
 Theban Treasury (Delphi)
 Thebe
 Thebes
 Thebes tablets
 Theia
 Theias
 Theiodamas
 Theios aner
 Thelxinoë
 Thelxion
 Thelxion of Argos
 Thelxion of Sicyon
 Themacus
 Themis
 Themis of Rhamnous
 Themiscyra
 Themison of Eretria
 Themison of Laodicea
 Themison of Samos
 Themison of Thera
 Themista of Lampsacus
 Themiste
 Themisto
 Themistoclean Wall
 Themistocles
 Theobule
 Theoclymenus
 Theodas of Laodicea
 Theodectes
 Theodorus of Cyrene
 Theodorus of Samos
 Theodorus the Atheist
 Theodosius of Alexandria (grammarian)
 Theodosius of Bithynia
 Theogenes
 Theognis
 Theognis of Megara
 Theogony
 Theomachy
 Theombrotus
 Theon of Alexandria
 Theon of Samos
 Theon of Smyrna
 Theophane
 Theophiliscus
 Theophilus (geographer)
 Theophrastus
 Theopompus
 Theopompus (comic poet)
 Theopompus of Sparta
 Theorica
 Theoris of Lemnos
 Theorodokoi
 Theoroi
 Theory of forms
 Theramenes
 Therapeutae of Asclepius
 Therapne
 Theras
 Theriac
 Theriaca
 Theristai
 Therma
 Thermopylae
 Thermos
 Thero
 Theron of Acragas
 Thersander
 Thersander (Epigoni)
 Thersanon
 Thersilochus
 Thersites
 Theseia
 Theseus
 Theseus Painter
 Theseus Ring
 Thesmophoria
 Thesmophoriazusae
 Thespia
 Thespiae
 Thespis
 Thespius
 Thesprotia (polis)
 Thesprotians
 Thessalian League
 Thessalian vase painting
 Thessaliotis
 Thessalus
 Thessalus
 Thestius
 Thestor (mythology)
 Theta
 Thetis
 Theudius
 Thiasus
 Thimbron (fl. 400–391 BC) 
 Third Macedonian War
 Third man argument
 Third Philippic
 Third Sacred War
 Thyreus (mythology)
 Thirty Tyrants
 Thirty Years' Peace
 Thisbe (Boeotia)
 Thoas
 Thoas (king of Aetolia)
 Thoas (king of Corinth)
 Thoas (king of Lemnos)
 Thoas (king of the Taurians)
 Thoas (son of Jason)
 Tholos
 Tholos of Delphi
 Thoön (mythology)
 Thootes
 Thorae
 Thorakitai
 Thorax (Aetolia)
 Thorax of Lacedaemonia
 Thorax of Larissa
 Thoricus
 Thrace (mythology)
 Thrasippus
 Thrasos
 Thrassa
 Thrasybulus
 Thrasybulus of Miletus
 Thrasybulus of Syracuse
 Thrasyllus
 Thrasymachus
 Thrasymachus of Corinth
 Thrasymedes
 Thrasymedes (mythology)
 Thrax
 Three Line Group
 Three-phase firing
 Thria (Attica)
 Thriasian Plain
 Thronium (Locris)
 Thucydides
 Thucydides, son of Melesias
 Thule
 Thumos
 Thyatira
 Thyestes
 Thyestes (Euripides)
 Thyia
 Thymaridas
 Thymbra
 Thymiaterion
 Thymochares
 Thymoetadae
 Thymoetes
 Thyreophoroi
 Thyreos
 Thyrgonidae
 Thyrsus
 Tiasa
 Timachidas of Rhodes
 Timaea, Queen of Sparta
 Timaeus (dialogue)
 Timaeus (historian)
 Timaeus of Locri
 Timaeus the Sophist
 Timaios of Elis
 Timanthes
 Timanthes of Cleonae
 Timanthes of Sicyon
 Timarchus of Miletus
 Timarete
 Timasitheus of Delphi
 Timasitheus of Lipara
 Timasitheus of Trapezus
 Timeline of ancient Greece
 Timeline of ancient Greek mathematicians
 Timeline of Athens
 Timeo Danaos et dona ferentes
 Timocharis
 Timoclea
 Timocleidas
 Timocles
 Timocracy
 Timocrates of Lampsacus
 Timocrates of Rhodes
 Timocrates of Syracuse
 Timocreon
 Timolaus of Cyzicus
 Timoleon
 Timomachus
 Timon of Athens (person)
 Timon of Phlius
 Timophanes
 Timotheus (aulist)
 Timotheus (general)
 Timotheus (sculptor)
 Timotheus of Miletus
 Timoxenos
 Timycha
 Tiphys
 Tiresias
 Tisamenus
 Tisamenus (King of Thebes)
 Tisamenus (son of Antiochus)
 Tisamenus (son of Orestes)
 Tisander
 Tisias
 Tisiphone
 Titacidae
 Titanomachy
 Titanomachy (epic poem)
 Titans
 Tithonos Painter
 Tithonus
 Titias
 Tityos
 Tityos Painter
 Tlepolemus
 Tleson
 Tmolus (father of Tantalus)
 Tmolus (son of Ares)
 Tolmides
 Tomb of Menecrates
 Toparches
 Tower of the Winds
 Toxaechmes
 Toxeus
 Toxotai
 Trachis (Phocis)
 Tractatus coislinianus
 Tragasus
 Tragic hero
 Trambelus
 Transcendentals
 Treasuries at Olympia
 Treasury of Atreus
 Treasury of Cyrene
 Treasury of the Acanthians
 Treasury of the Massaliots (Delphi)
 Treaty of Dardanos
 Trechus (mythology)
 Trial of Socrates
 Trick at Mecone
 Tricorythus
 Trident of Poseidon
 Trierarch
 Trierarchy
 Triglyph
 Trigonon
 Trinemeia
 Triopas
 Triopas of Argos
 Triphylia
 Triphylians
 Tripolis (region of Laconia)
 Triptolemos Painter
 Triptolemos (play)
 Triptolemus
 Trireme
 Tritaea (Achaea)
 Tritaea (Locris)
 Tritaea (Phocis)
 Tritagonist
 Triteia
 Triton
 Trittys
 Trochilus
 Troezen
 Troglodytae
 Troilus
 Troilus of Elis
 Trojan Battle Order
 Trojan Horse
 Trojan language
 Trojan Leaders
 Trojan War
 Trophimoi
 Trophonius
 Tros
 Tryphon
 Tübingen Hoplitodromos Runner
 Tunnel of Eupalinos
 Twelve Olympians
 Two-handled amphora (Boston 63.1515)
 Tyche
 Tychon
 Tydeus
 Tydeus Painter
 Tyllus
 Tympanum
 Tymphaea
 Tyndareus
 Types of Women
 Typhon
 Typology of Greek vase shapes
 Tyrannion of Amisus
 Tyrannus (mythology)
 Tyrant
 Tyrmeidae
 Tyro
 Tyrrhenian amphorae
 Tyrtaeus

U 

 Ucalegon
 Ula (Caria)
 Underworld Painter
 Unity of opposites
 Unmoved mover
 Upper Agryle
 Upper Ancyle
 Upper Lamptrai
 Upper Paeania
 Upper Pergase
 Upper Potamus
 Upper World
 Upsilon
 Urania
 Urania (mythology)
 Uranium (Caria)
 Uranus
 Use of costume in Athenian tragedy

V 

 Valle dei Templi
 Valley of the Muses
 Vari Cave
 Varrese Painter
 Vasiliki ware
 Velchanos
 Venus de' Medici
 Venus de Milo
 Vergina Sun
 Victorious Youth
 Voidokilia beach
 Vrysinas

W 

 Wall Paintings of Thera
 Wandering womb
 War against Nabis
 Warfare in ancient Greek art
 Warfare in Minoan Art
 Warrior Vase
 Wars of Alexander the Great
 Wars of the Delian League
 Wars of the Diadochi
 Water (classical element)
 Ways and Means (Xenophon)
 Wedding of Ceyx
 Wedding Painter
 West Slope Ware
 Wheel of fire
 White ground technique
 Wild Goat Style
 Wine-dark sea (Homer)
 Winged Gorgoneion (Olympia B 110)
 Winged helmet
 Winnowing Oar
 Women in ancient Sparta
 Women in Classical Athens
 Women of Trachis
 Works of Demosthenes

X 

 Xanthe (mythology)
 Xanthias
 Xanthika
 Xanthippe
 Xanthippe (mythology)
 Xanthippus
 Xanthippus of Carthage
 Xanthius
 Xanthos (King of Thebes)
 Xanthus
 Xanthus (historian)
 Xenagoras (geometer)
 Xenagoras (historian)
 Xenagus
 Xenarchos
 Xenarchus (comic poet)
 Xenarchus of Seleucia
 Xenarius
 Xenelasia
 Xenia
 Xeniades
 Xenias of Arcadia
 Xenias of Elis
 Xenoclea
 Xenokleides
 Xenocles
 Xenocrates 
 Xenocrates of Aphrodisias
 Xenodice
 Xenokles Painter
 Xenon (tyrant)
 Xenopatra
 Xenophanes   
 Xenophilus
 Xenophon
 Xenophon (son of Euripides)
 Xenophon of Aegium
 Xenophon of Corinth
 Xenophon of Ephesus
 Xenos
 Xerxes' Pontoon Bridges
 Xi (letter)
 Xiphos
 Xoanon
 Xuthus
 Xypete
 Xyston
 Xystus

Y 

 Yona
 YZ Group

Z 

 Zacynthus
 Zagreus
 Zakoros
 Zaleucus
 Zanes of Olympia
 Zarax
 Zarex
 Zeleia
 Zelus
 Zeno (physician)
 Zeno of Citium
 Zeno of Cyprus
 Zeno of Elea
 Zeno of Rhodes
 Zeno of Tarsus
 Zeno's paradoxes
 Zenobius
 Zenodorus
 Zenodotus
 Zenodotus (Stoic)
 Zereia
 Zeta
 Zeus
 Zeus Areius
 Zeus Georgos
 Zeuxidamus
 Zeuxippe
 Zeuxippus
 Zeuxippus of Heraclea
 Zeuxippus of Sicyon
 Zeuxis
 Zeuxis of Tarentum    
 Zeuxo
 Zmaratha
 Zoilus
 Zone (colony)
 Zone (vestment)
 Zopyron
 Zopyrus (physician)
 Zoster (Attica)
 Zoster (costume)

Lists 

 Ancient Greek and Roman roofs
 Ancient Greek cities
 Ancient Greek monetary standards
 Ancient Greek philosophers
 Cynic
 Epicurean
 Platonist
 Stoic
 Ancient Greek playwrights
 Ancient Greek poets
 Ancient Greek temples
 Ancient Greek theatres
 Ancient Greek tribes
 Ancient Greek tyrants
 Ancient Greeks
 Kings of Athens
 Ancient Macedonians
 Ancient Olympic victors
 Greek mathematicians
 Greek mythological creatures
 Greek mythological figures
 Greek place names
 Greek phrases
 Greek vase painters
 Homeric characters
 Kings of Sparta
 Minor Greek mythological figures
 Oracular statements from Delphi
 Schools of philosophy
 Speakers in Plato's dialogues
 Stoae
 Thracian Greeks
 Trojan War characters

See also 

 Outline of ancient Greece
 Timeline of ancient Greece

 
I